= Everett, Washington =

Everett dᶻəɬigʷəd
- City
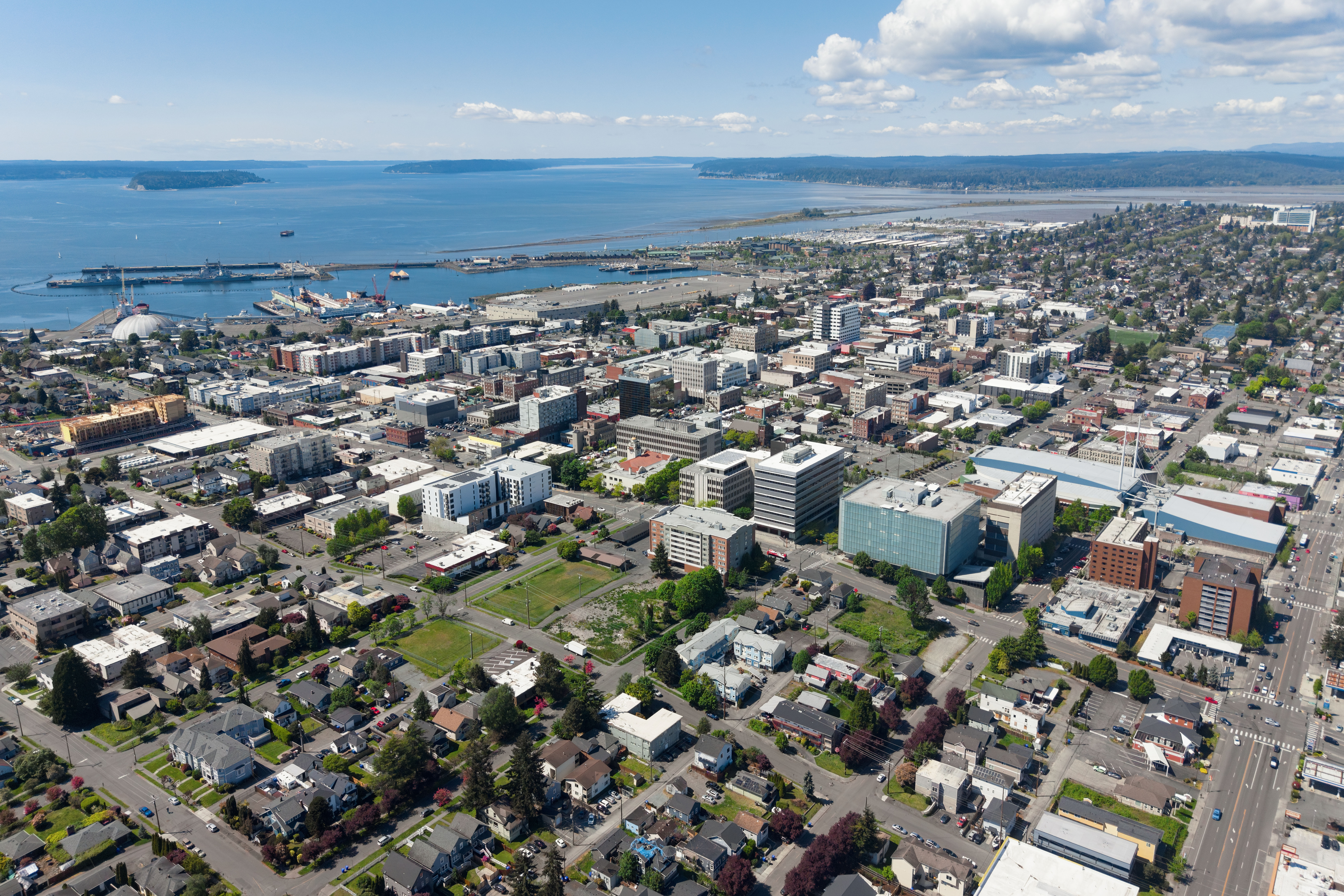
- Aerial view of Downtown Everett, looking northwest towards Port Gardner Bay

- Seal Logo
- Interactive map of Everett
- Coordinates: 47°58′45″N 122°12′6″W
- Country: United States
- State: Washington
- County: Snohomish
- Established: 1890
- Incorporated: May 4, 1893

Government
  - Type: Mayor–council
  - Mayor: Cassie Franklin

Area
  - City: 47.91 sq mi (124.08 km^{2})
  - Land: 33.19 sq mi (85.96 km^{2})
  - Water: 14.71 sq mi (38.11 km^{2})

Population (2020)
  - City: 110,629
  - Estimate (2024): 113,011
  - Rank: US: 280th WA: 7th
  - Density: 3,358.6/sq mi (1,296.76/km^{2})
  - Metro: 4,018,762 (US: 15th)
- Demonym: Everettite
- Time zone: UTC−8 (Pacific (PST))
  - Summer (DST): UTC−7 (PDT)
- ZIP codes: 98201, 98203, 98204, 98206, 98207, 98208, 98213
- Area code: 425
- FIPS code: 53-22640
- Website: everettwa.gov

Everett (/ˈɛvrɪt/ EV-rit; Lushootseed: dᶻəɬigʷəd [d͜zəˈɬi̞ɡʷəd]) is the county seat of and the most populous city in Snohomish County, Washington, United States. It is 25 miles (40 km) north of Seattle and is one of the main cities in the metropolitan area and the Puget Sound region. Everett is the seventh-most populous city in the state, with 110,629 residents as of the 2020 census. The city is primarily situated on a peninsula at the mouth of the Snohomish River along Port Gardner Bay, an inlet of Possession Sound (itself part of Puget Sound), and extends to the south and west.

The Port Gardner Peninsula has been inhabited by the Snohomish people for thousands of years, whose main settlement, hibulb, was located at Preston Point near the mouth of the river. Modern settlement in the area began with loggers and homesteaders arriving in the 1860s, but plans to build a city were not conceived until 1890. A consortium of East Coast investors seeking to build a major industrial city acquired land in the area and filed a plat for "Everett", which they named in honor of Everett Colby, the son of investor Charles L. Colby. The city was incorporated in 1893, shortly after the arrival of the Great Northern Railway, and prospered as a major lumber center with several large sawmills. Everett became the county seat in 1897 after a dispute with Snohomish contested over several elections and a Supreme Court case. The city was the site of labor unrest during the 1910s, which culminated in the Everett massacre in 1916 that killed several members of the Industrial Workers of the World.

The area was connected by new interurban railways and highway bridges in the 1920s, transforming it into a major commercial hub, and gained an airport at Paine Field in 1936. The city's economy transitioned away from lumber and towards aerospace after World War II, with the construction of Boeing's aircraft assembly plant at Paine Field in 1967. Boeing's presence brought additional industrial and commercial development to Everett, as well as new residential neighborhoods to the south and west of the peninsula that was annexed by the city. Boeing remains the city's largest employer, alongside the U.S. Navy, which has operated Naval Station Everett since 1994.

Everett remains a major employment center for Snohomish County, but has also become a bedroom community for Seattle in recent decades. It is connected to Seattle by Interstate 5 and various public transit services at Everett Station, including the Sounder commuter train, Amtrak, and commuter buses. Everett stages several annual festivals and is also home to minor league sports teams, including the Everett Silvertips at Angel of the Winds Arena and Everett Aquasox at Funko Field.

== History ==
=== Prehistory and Hibulb village ===
The earliest humans entered the Puget Sound region approximately 12,000 years before present after the recession of the Vashon Glacier. The earliest evidence of human habitation on the Port Gardner Peninsula dates back to approximately 2,000 years before present. The Snohomish people, who had many villages along the Snohomish River and around Possession Sound, had their principal settlement at Preston Point, known in the Lushootseed language as hibulb (pronounced HEE-bulb). The village of Hibulb, located below the bluff at the mouth of the Snohomish River, was one of the largest Snohomish settlements and the tribe's most important. It held considerable influence over other settlements and had the largest potlatch house in the Snohomish's territory; it was also heavily fortified by a large cedar palisade to deter attackers. The village also had four large cedar longhouses, each around 100 feet (30 m) long, and smaller structures.

The Snohomish consider hibulb to be their place of origin and references it in the creation myth for the deity dukʷibəɬ. The tribe's population was estimated to be over 6,000 prior to several smallpox and measles epidemics in the early 19th century that severely affected the Puget Sound region. A massive landslide at Camano Head (Lushootseed: x̌ʷuyšəd) in the 1820s destroyed several villages and caused a tidal wave that washed away portions of Hibulb.

In Lushootseed, the modern city of Everett has two names: dᶻəɬigʷəd, the name of Forgotten Creek near the waterfront; or hibulb, which comes from the name of Preston Point and the village. The name hibulb itself originates from hibuləb, which means "water bubbling out of the ground." It is related to the word bələwəb, meaning "boiling" or "bubbling." In 2013, the City of Everett and Tulalip Tribes installed signage at Legion Park to display illustrations of the Hibulb village and its history; the park is atop the bluff that overlooks the village site.

=== Early history and American settlement ===
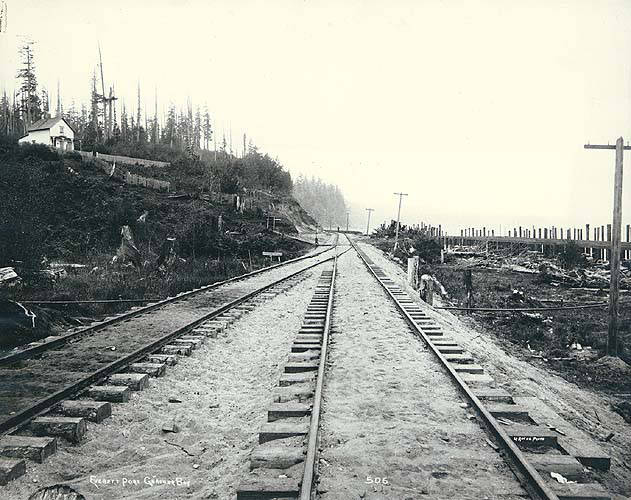
Looking south on the Seattle and Montana Railroad as it passes Port Gardner Bay in 1891

The first Europeans in the area were explorers from the 1792 Vancouver Expedition, who landed on a beach on the modern Everett waterfront and claimed the land for England on June 4, the birthday of King George III. Puget Sound was further explored and charted by the Hudson's Bay Company in 1824 and the United States Exploring Expedition under Charles Wilkes in 1841, ahead of a larger American presence in the area.

The Snohomish were one of the signatory tribes of the Treaty of Point Elliott in 1855, which ceded their lands to the Washington territorial government and established the nearby Tulalip Indian Reservation, to which many of the Snohomish would be removed. The first permanent American settler to arrive on the peninsula was Dennis Brigham, a carpenter from Worcester, Massachusetts, who claimed a 160-acre (65 ha) homestead and built a cabin for himself. Several other families established their own homesteads, as well as a general store and a sawmill that quickly went out of business. Over the next several years a handful of loggers moved to the area, but plans for a settlement were not conceived until 1890.

During an Alaskan cruise via the Inside Passage aboard the steamship Queen of the Pacific in July 1890, lumberman Henry Hewitt Jr. and railroad executive Charles L. Colby drew up plans for an industrial city on Port Gardner Bay. Hewitt and Colby had previously met in Wisconsin, where they operated lumber and maritime businesses, respectively, and in Tacoma, Washington, from which the voyage began. The pair sought to build an industrial center at a site they speculated would be the first ocean port for Great Northern Railway, to be constructed by James J. Hill, and turn it into a "Pittsburgh of the West". On August 22, 1890, the plat for a 50-acre (20 ha) townsite on the peninsula was filed by the Rucker Brothers, who had moved north from Tacoma and had more modest plans for the area.

By September, Colby had secured $800,000 in funding (equivalent to $26.1 million in 2025 dollars) from oil magnate John D. Rockefeller and his railroad associate Colgate Hoyt to begin acquiring land while avoiding property speculators. The Hewitt–Colby syndicate decided to use a name that would not identify a specific location, naming their planned city after Everett Colby, the fifteen-year-old son of investor Charles L. Colby, who had displayed a "prodigious appetite" at a group dinner. The Everett Land Company was incorporated in Pierce County on November 19, 1890, and acquired 434.15 acres (175.69 ha) of property from the Rucker Brothers a week later. Several businesses had already been established on the peninsula, generally dividing themselves between the Bayside facing Port Gardner and Riverside facing the Snohomish River. The Rucker Brothers' plat was withdrawn after an agreement to donate half of their holdings was reached with Hewitt, who promised a series of industrial developments under the "Remarkable Document", which was also used to acquire property from other landowners in the area.

Everett gained its first businesses in early 1891, as the new settlement on the Snohomish River attracted land speculators and commitments to build lumber mills and other industrial enterprises. The first post office opened in July at a general store on the bayfront, where the Seattle and Montana Railroad was built in October. By the end of the year, Everett had gained its first school, saloon, church, and sawmill. The Swalwell Brothers had begun selling property in Riverside along Hewitt Avenue, which was laid 100 feet (30 m) wide and became the main east–west thoroughfare from the riverfront when it was completed in June 1892. The Everett Land Company did not initially organize a municipal government, leaving local issues to be resolved by a "citizen's committee" formed by 21 residents on March 21, 1892. The area had an estimated population of 5,000 by the end of the year, shortly before the completion of the Great Northern Railway across Stevens Pass on January 6, 1893. The railroad did not terminate in Everett as originally hoped by land speculators, instead continuing along the shoreline of Puget Sound to Seattle.

=== Incorporation and early years ===
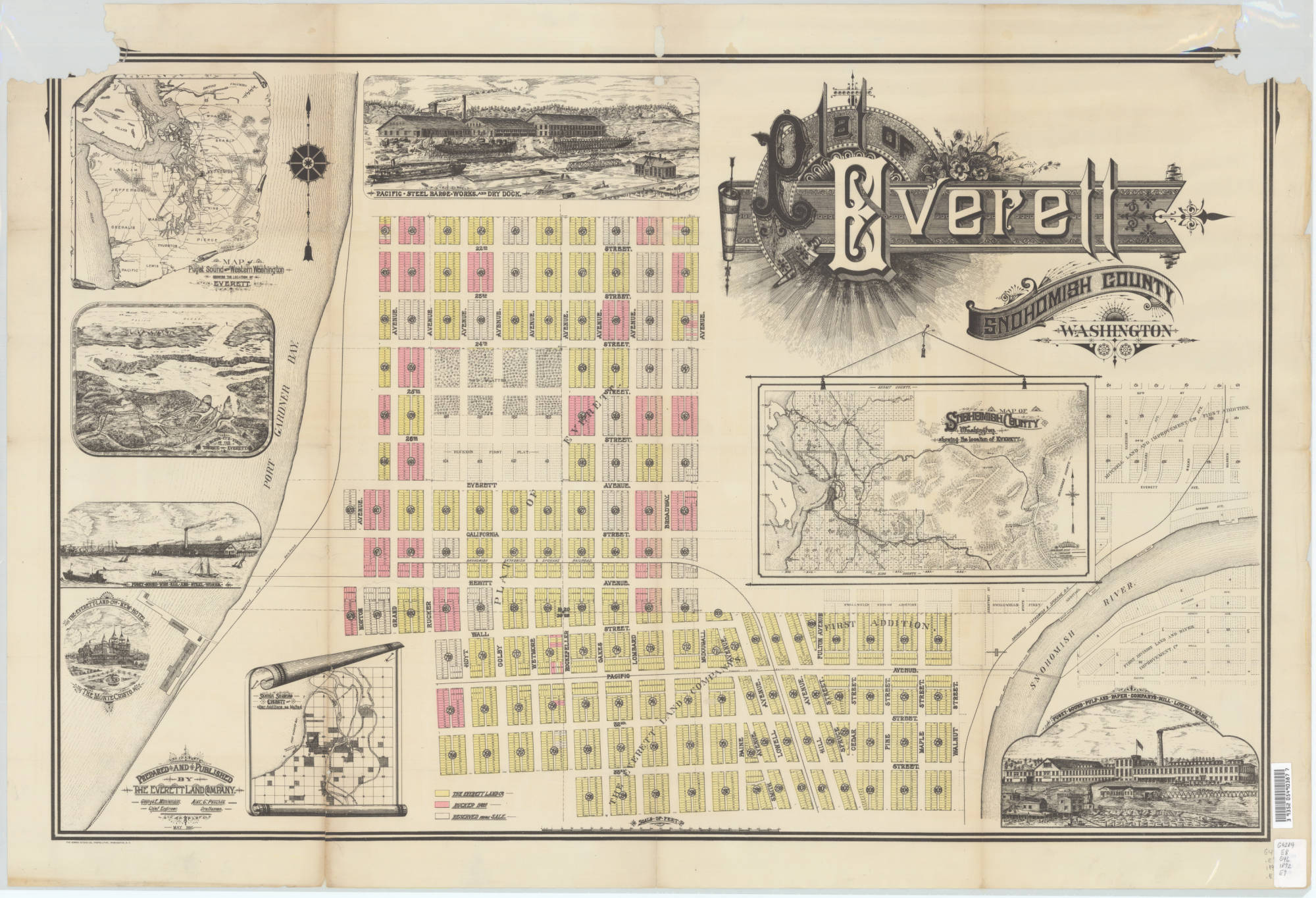
The town plat filed by the Everett Land Company in 1892

Following the acquisition of tidelands on the waterfront, which had been in dispute, the Everett Land Company allowed for a municipal government to be formed. The initial city boundaries were set by the company to avoid taxing the industrial areas and exclude the town of Lowell, which predated Everett. On April 27, 1893, the citizens of Everett voted 670–99 in favor of incorporating as a city, and elected Thomas Dwyer as mayor. The incorporation was certified by the Snohomish County government on May 4, 1893. The city's privately owned streetcar system launched on July 3, 1893, with lines connecting the Hewitt Avenue commercial district to mills, smelters, and areas as far as Lowell.

The Everett Land Company ran into financial trouble within months of the city's incorporation as the impact of the Panic of 1893 was felt in the region. The company's investment in the Monte Cristo area yielded ore of poorer quality than expected and it was unable to meet the promises in the "Remarkable Document", which was amended several times with the Rucker Brothers, by then junior partners in the company. Rockefeller called his investment into question and appointed Frederick Gates to begin divestment while Colby and Hoyt remained as the leaders of the company. Several of the major businesses in Everett closed or failed during the three-year peak of the economic depression, but work on Alexander McDougall's Whaleback was finished with the launch of SS City of Everett in October 1894, the largest to be built on Puget Sound at the time. The Everett Women's Book Club was established in 1894 and opened the city's first hospital and public library, which would later expand into the Everett Public Library system.

Despite the economic turmoil, Everett continued to grow with the addition of new businesses as the area's lumber activities increased. Other industries also expanded in Everett, including a local cannery, a brickworks, and several ore smelters. The discovery of new mineral deposits in Monte Cristo fueled a population boom, along with the completion of the Everett and Monte Cristo Railway under the ownership of Rockefeller. The city also benefited from the Klondike Gold Rush, building several steamboats to transport prospectors and entrepreneurs.

In its early years, Everett launched a campaign to become county seat by replacing Snohomish, which had waned in importance following the completion of several railroads serving other cities in the county. An election to determine which city would be named county seat was scheduled for November 6, 1894, beginning a heated debate by citizens and newspapers. The initial count by the commissioners was announced on December 19 in Everett's favor, amid accusations of fraud and bought votes from both sides. Following an appeal from Snohomish, the Washington Supreme Court declared the result to be invalid and blocked the move, but a recount by the commissioners in October 1895 remained in Everett's favor. A long legal battle was fought between the two cities and was decided in October 1895 by the Supreme Court, who ruled that Everett would become county seat per the legal and binding recount. In January 1897, the county government's records were moved by wagons from Snohomish to Everett, where a three-story courthouse was opened on February 1, 1898.

=== Milltown and labor unrest ===
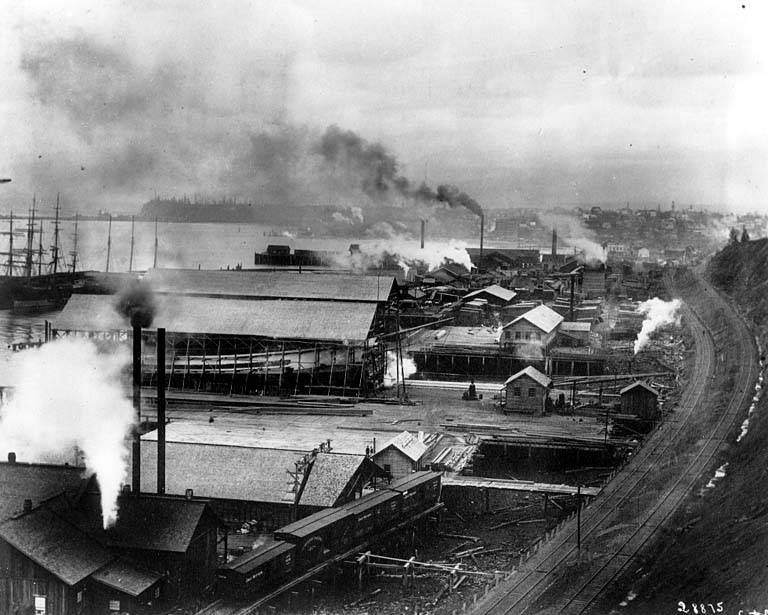
The Everett waterfront, c. 1905

After outside investors withdrew their shares in the Everett Land Company, its holdings were transferred in 1899 to the Everett Improvement Company, controlled by James J. Hill and his trusted associate John T. McChesney. Friedrich Weyerhäuser acquired Hill's timberland holdings in the Pacific Northwest and chose Everett for the site of his major lumber mill, which opened in 1902. By the end of the decade, Everett had 11 lumber mills, 16 shingle mills, and 17 combined mills—surpassing every other city in the state and earning it the nicknames of "Milltown" and the "City of Smokestacks". The Weyerhaeuser Company opened its larger second mill, named Mill B, on the Snohomish River in April 1915 with a 203-foot (62 m) smokestack and the ability to process 1,000,000 board feet of timber.

The city gained its first interurban railway in 1903 with the opening of the Snohomish Interurban. This was followed by the Seattle Interurban on May 2, 1910, which ran hourly on an inland route via Alderwood Manor. Everett became a first-class city in 1907 and had a population of nearly 25,000 residents by 1910, a quarter of whom were foreign-born. The local lumber economy prospered during the rebuilding of San Francisco following the 1906 earthquake, which created a high demand for West Coast wood products. Everett itself suffered from a major fire on August 2, 1909, that destroyed 12 commercial buildings and the county courthouse. The city's growth was not hindered by the fire and a new county courthouse opened in 1910 alongside the Everett High School campus. Everett voters approved a new city charter in 1912 that reorganized the city government into a three-commissioner council with a ceremonial mayor.

During the first decade of the 20th century, workers at mills and other factories began organizing labor unions under the Everett Central Trades Council, which had 27 member trades and six unions by 1901. The council had 25 unions by 1907 and became affiliated with the American Federation of Labor, using its influence to stage strikes and work stoppages that resulted in wage increases and safer conditions at mills, where 35 workers had died in 1909. Everett was also home to local socialist groups and organizers, who published the Labor Journal and The Commonwealth on a weekly basis until 1914. Several survivors of the September 1907 anti-Indian riots in Bellingham settled in Everett for two months, but were beaten and forcefully evicted by a mob.

The city's labor unrest culminated in the Everett massacre on November 5, 1916, the deadliest event in Pacific Northwest labor history. A strike of shingle weavers began at local mills in May 1916 and continued for months with violent attacks from mill owners, which attracted attention from the Industrial Workers of the World (IWW), a radical socialist union who provided speakers at Everett events. The city government passed a new ordinance to restrict street speaking as a result of tensions between the IWW and county sheriff Donald McRae, who armed a local militia and beat 41 union members who were attempting to enter the city by boat on October 30, 1916. The beatings drew anger from union members and other Everett citizens, prompting 300 IWW members to travel on the steamers Verona and Calista from Seattle to Everett on November 5, when they were confronted at the docks by McRae and his posse of 200 citizen deputies, who feared violence and arson from the group. After a heated debate followed by several minutes of gunfire, five people on the Verona were killed and two deputies on the dock had been mortally wounded from friendly fire; an unofficial death toll of twelve IWW members was determined from the recovery of underwater bodies. At least 50 people were injured, including McRae, and 297 were arrested in Everett and Seattle; only one IWW member, Thomas Tracy, was ultimately tried and found not guilty of first-degree murder after a two-month trial.

The shingle weavers strike ended on November 10, 1916, with no concessions from the mill owners, and local residents turned against the IWW for escalating the dispute. The labor tensions subsided with the entry of the U.S. into World War I, despite an attempted comeback by the IWW in disrupting logging for the war effort. As a result of the massacre, the state government passed laws to prohibit citizens from advocating for anarchy or violent overthrow, which were not repealed until 1999. The massacre was largely unacknowledged by local residents until the late 20th century, when book accounts were published and a historic marker was installed overlooking the former docks.

=== Inter-war years ===
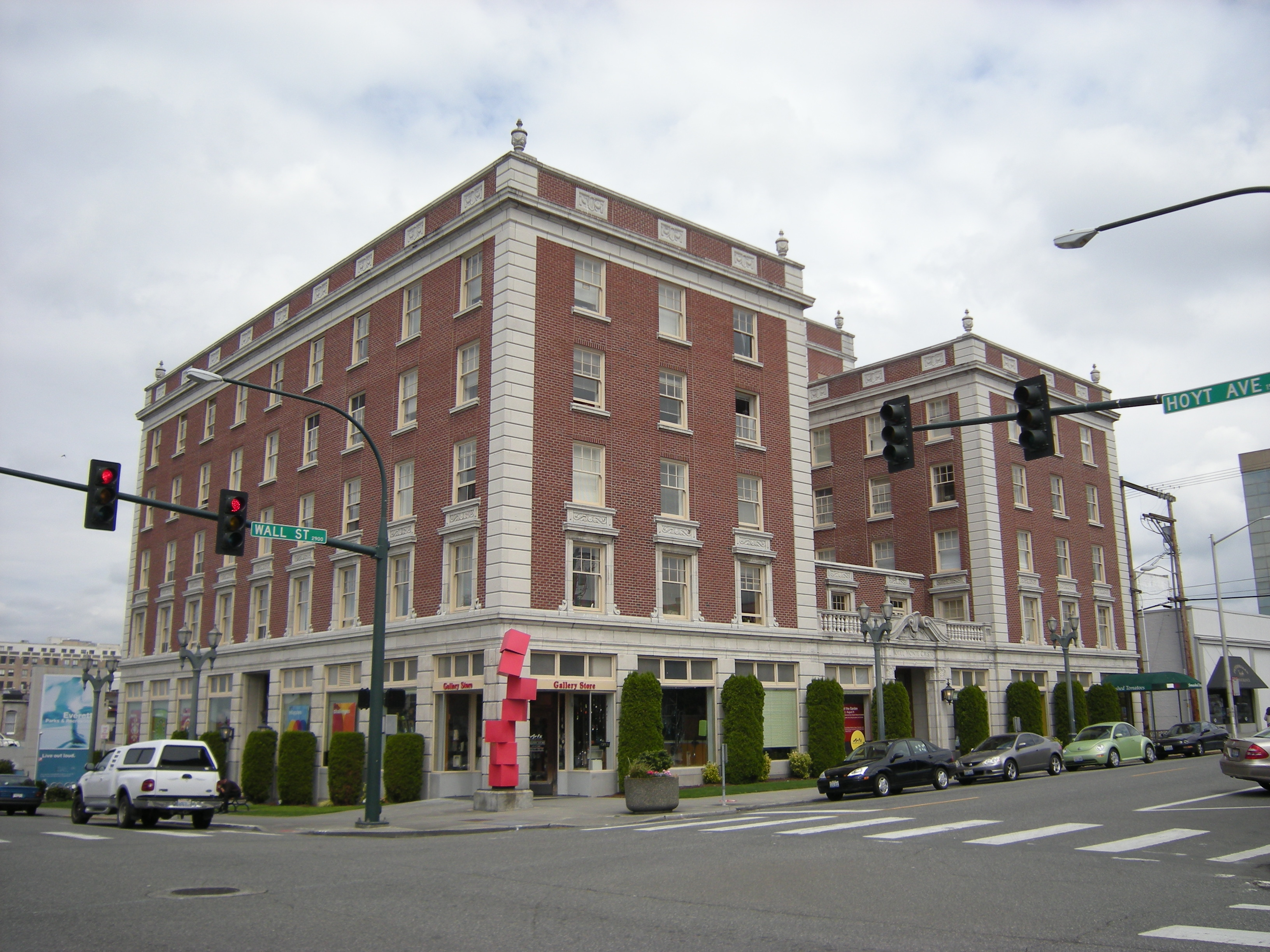
The Monte Cristo Hotel, completed in 1925

The local timber industry continued its boom and bust cycle into the 1920s, suffering from price swings but benefiting from the 1923 Japanese earthquake to supply lumber and the opening of the Panama Canal. The Clough-Hartley shingle mill claimed to be the largest in the world, producing 1.5 million wood shingles per day; the city produced approximately 4.5 million shingles and 3.5 million board feet of lumber per day in 1920. The Port of Everett was created on July 13, 1918, to enable public ownership of the waterfront and promote economic development in the city. By the end of the 1920s, the port had opened the county's first airport on Ebey Island and acquired the 14th Street Dock and Jetty Island from the Everett Improvement Company. The city also acquired the private water system in 1915 and replaced it with a new supply from the Sultan River basin that was fully activated four years later.

Everett's central commercial district grew from a handful of businesses into a busy downtown during the 1920s, including the construction of several multi-story office and retail buildings, two junior high schools, a modern city hall, and additions to the city's two hospitals. The six-story Monte Cristo Hotel opened in 1925 with 140 guest rooms, elaborate furnishings, and a banquet hall that would host civic functions for several decades. The county's first radio station, KFBL (now KRKO), began broadcasting on August 25, 1922, and was among the earliest in the state. In 1924, a third mill at the Weyerhaeuser complex, which employed 1,500 people and contributed to $28.125 million (equivalent to $415 million in 2025 dollars) in annual timber output by the end of the decade.

The widespread adoption of the automobile lead to the construction of new roads out of Everett and Snohomish County to neighboring regions. The earliest iteration of the Stevens Pass Highway opened in 1925, providing the second automobile crossing of the Cascade Mountains in the state and access to new timberland and other resources. The highway was later improved with the opening of the Hewitt Avenue Trestle in 1939, crossing the Snohomish River and Ebey Island on an elevated viaduct. The Pacific Highway (part of U.S. Route 99) was completed in 1927 with the opening of four bridges across the Snohomish River delta to Marysville. Everett was also among the first cities in the U.S. to replace its streetcars with buses, doing so in 1923, and the last train on the Seattle–Everett Interurban ran on February 20, 1939.

Everett experienced a major rise in unemployment as demand for lumber products dropped, with an estimated 32 percent of property taxes left unpaid in 1932. Charitable organizations in the area set up relief programs and provided work for unemployed residents, including commencing work on a 185-acre (75 ha) park and golf course in North Everett that later became American Legion Memorial Park. The federal Works Progress Administration employed local workers to construct a new downtown public library, develop parks, expand schools, and improve streets. The works program also built a new county airport, later named Paine Field, that opened southwest of Everett in 1936 to serve commercial uses. The airport was appropriated for military use during World War II, but was later turned over to county ownership. The war also brought a new shipyard operated by the Everett-Pacific Shipbuilding & Dry Dock Company, which employed 6,000 workers and closed in 1949.

=== Boeing and suburban development ===
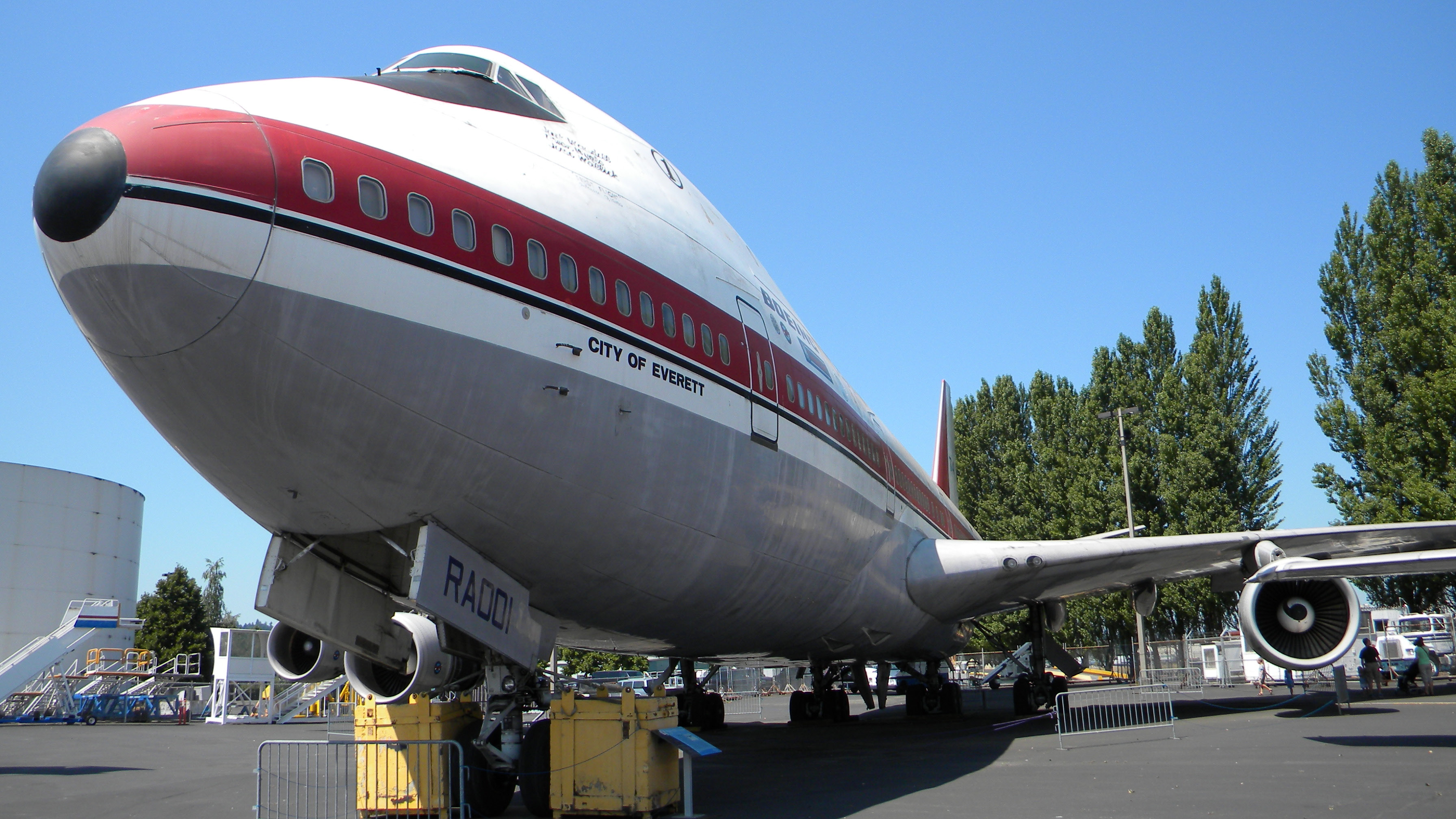
The first Boeing 747 produced at the Everett assembly plant, now on display at the Museum of Flight in Seattle

Downtown Everett continued to grow as the regional commercial center following the end of the war, with four large department stores and dozens of smaller retailers and restaurants in a six-block radius of Hewitt Avenue and Colby Avenue. The population boom triggered construction of new housing areas around the peninsula and new schools, with enrollment in the Everett School District increasing from 6,000 in 1941 to 11,600 in 1951. The school district also built Everett Memorial Stadium in 1947 to host high school sports and civic events. A new public housing complex, Baker Heights, was built in 1943 to house military personnel amid a local shortage, providing 1,275 apartments that later went to low-income families.

The first suburban-style supermarket opened on Evergreen Way (part of U.S. Route 99) in 1950 and was followed by strip malls and similar big box stores along the highway by the end of the decade. The areas surrounding the highway were developed into suburban housing and made up the bulk of the city's then-largest annexation, of 900 acres (360 ha) near Madison Street on December 31, 1959. A second round of South Everett annexations completed in 1961 and 1972 added 10,300 acres (4,200 ha) to the city, including the Lowell area, and boosted its population to over 50,000. Everett's second high school, Cascade High School, opened in 1961 to serve the annexed areas. The new suburban neighborhoods were linked via Interstate 5, which opened from North Seattle to Everett in February 1965 and bypassed U.S. Route 99 with a six-lane freeway roughly following the former interurban railway. The freeway was extended around the east side of Downtown Everett in January 1968 and Interstate 5 was completed within Washington with the opening of the section connecting the city to Marysville in May 1969.

The Boeing Company opened its first Everett factory in 1943 as part of its wartime production for the B-17 program. The company moved to the Everett–Pacific Shipyard in 1956 and grew to be the city's largest single employer by 1965, with 1,728 employees. Boeing approved early development of its Boeing 747 passenger jetliner in March 1966 and purchased 780 acres (320 ha) near Paine Field in June to build its assembly plant for the plane, which would become the world's first "jumbo jet". Work on the first 747 plane, named the "City of Everett", began at the unfinished factory in January 1967. It was unveiled in September 1968 and made its maiden flight on February 9, 1969. The Everett factory was expanded several times to accommodate later Boeing programs, including the 767, 777, and 787 Dreamliner.

The impending construction of the Boeing plant triggered a new residential and commercial development in Everett and surrounding communities in the late 1960s. By the end of the decade, Everett had annexed additional areas to stretch the city boundaries west to Mukilteo and south to Silver Lake. A new freeway, State Route 526, was built to connect the plant to Interstate 5 at the Eastmont Interchange, where the Everett Mall was planned to be built. The mall was built in stages, beginning with a Sears store in February 1969 and ending with a grand opening on October 9, 1974, with 14 stores. The development of the mall was slowed by a local economic crash that began with the cancellation of Boeing's supersonic jetliner program in 1971 and financial issues for airlines that affected sales of the Boeing 747. The Everett factory reduced its number of employees from 25,000 to 4,700, causing a spike in local unemployment rates and an exodus of former employees; the Everett School District closed three of its elementary schools as enrollment dropped by 3,000 students.

During the 1970s, several of Everett's surviving lumber and pulp mills closed as they were too costly to renovate or replace, marking the end of the "Mill Town". Lowell's pulp mill closed in 1972 and was followed by Weyerhaeuser's Mill B in 1979 and Mill A in 1981. The final Weyerhaeuser mill closed in 1992, leaving the Scott Paper Company as the last remaining paper mill in Everett until its closure in 2012. The city instead deepened its connections to the aerospace and high-tech industry, opening facilities in the 1980s for Hewlett-Packard, Fluke, and other electronics firms. Downtown Everett also declined as an activity center as retailers and car dealerships moved to suburban areas, despite the opening of a large hotel and several high-rise office building. A city landfill southeast of Downtown Everett was turned into a recycling plant for millions of rubber tires, nicknamed "Mount Firestone", which caught fire in September 1984 and burned for seven months as the incident gained national media attention.

=== Naval base and downtown revival ===
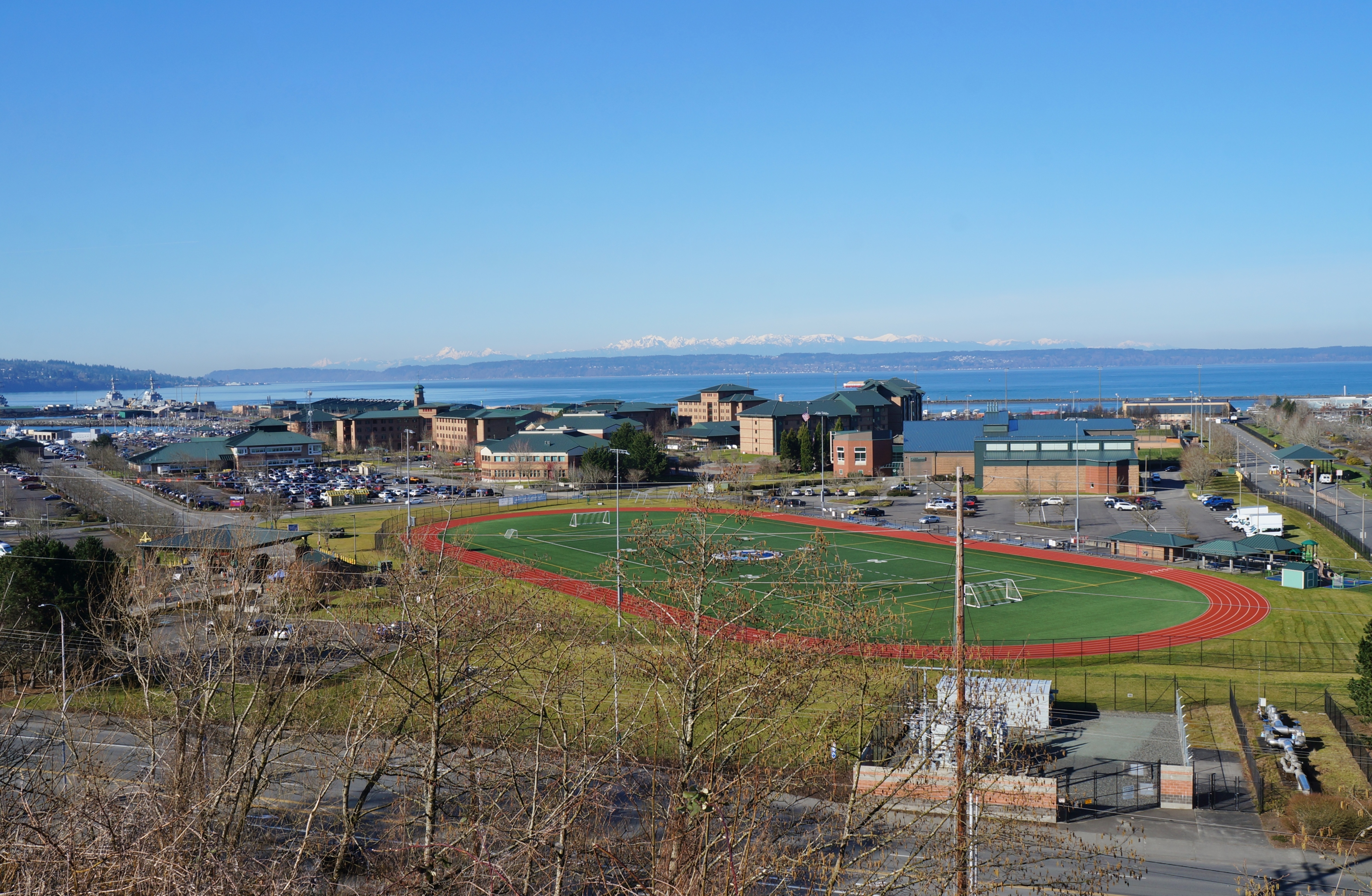
Naval Station Everett, a U.S. Navy facility opened in 1994 under the Strategic Homeport program

Boeing recovered from its sales slump and increased employment at its Everett plant to 18,000 people in 1980 as it prepared to unveil the Boeing 767, the second family of jetliners to be produced in Everett. A neighboring industrial park along Seaway Boulevard was developed in the 1980s as demand for commercial space in the city grew. The Port of Everett began developing a new shopping and retail complex on Port Gardner Bay as it looked to diversify away from industrial uses, but the project ran into financial issues as Everett-area employers failed or laid off workers amid an aerospace slump in 1981–82. The U.S. Navy selected the former shipyard site on Port Gardner Bay as the site of a new military base in 1984 under the Strategic Homeport program. Naval Station Everett and its 1,600-foot (490 m) pier were constructed between 1987 and 1994 alongside auxiliary facilities located to the north in Smokey Point. The first ships arrived in September 1994. Naval Station Everett was the long-term home of several aircraft carriers, including the USS Abraham Lincoln.

The city underwent an urban revival in the 1990s, fueled by the upcoming centennial celebrations and a third expansion of the Boeing plant for the Boeing 777 program. The plant expansion was completed in 1993, enlarging the world's largest building by volume to 472,000,000 cubic feet (13,400,000 m^{3}) covering 96 acres (39 ha). Everett's inner neighborhoods grew with new residential and commercial development, including Downtown Everett, where a beautification and restoration program had begun in the 1980s. The downtown program included a road diet for Colby Avenue, planter boxes on widened sidewalks, and new parks. Several new office buildings were completed in Downtown Everett, including the 11-story Everett Mutual Tower, and other historic buildings were renovated or restored. The city also annexed 465 acres (188 ha) near Paine Field in March 2000, bringing Everett's population to over 91,000. Everett was recognized as an All-America City by the National Civic League in 2002 and has been a member of the Tree City USA program since 1993. The city's Delta neighborhood underwent extensive environmental cleanup that began in the 2000s with funds from Asarco after the discovery of soil contamination from the shuttered smelter.

Everett was identified as a key transport hub under the regional Sound Transit system, which was approved in a ballot measure in 1996 after an earlier failed attempt. The transit agency opened a multimodal train and bus center, Everett Station, in February 2003 to replace scattered downtown facilities for Amtrak, Greyhound, and local transit. It would also serve as the northern terminus for Sounder commuter rail and Sound Transit Express buses, which both connect Everett to Seattle. A six-mile (9.7 km) section of Interstate 5 was rebuilt by the state government from 2005 to 2008 by adding new lanes and improving several interchanges at a cost of $263 million. Everett remains home to one of the most congested stretches of I-5, which is also among the worst in the United States for travel delays.

Downtown Everett remained a center for new development in the 2000s and 2010s, with several projects completed by local governments and private developers. The Everett Events Center (now Angels of the Winds Arena) opened in 2003 as an indoor sports venue, convention center, and community ice rink. The county government redeveloped its Everett office campus by building a new administrative center, jail, parking garage, and public plaza that opened in 2005. In the 2010s, two new downtown hotels were opened along with several apartment buildings that were encouraged by relaxed zoning policies. As the region's homeless population grew, Everett added two supportive housing buildings in downtown to provide 150 units of low-income housing with access to social services.

Boeing selected Everett as the main site of its 787 Dreamliner and 747-8 programs, which did not require major building expansions. The company also partnered with the county government to create the Future of Flight Aviation Center & Boeing Tour, an aviation museum at Paine Field that opened in 2005. The Boeing 777X program launched in 2013 with plans to build a wing assembly center adjacent to the Everett plant, which opened in 2016. Commercial passenger service at Paine Field resumed at a new terminal on March 4, 2019, after earlier plans from the 1980s onward were blocked by nearby residents.

=== Contemporary redevelopment ===
The city government began planning for a major redevelopment of a former landfill on the Snohomish River waterfront in the late 1990s, but the project was stalled as private developers declined to move the project forward. The original concept for the 139-acre (56 ha) property was an entertainment center with shopping, housing, offices, and parks. The riverfront project was ultimately divided into three sections: a southern portion for 235 single-family homes that was constructed in 2016; a center portion with commercial space, apartments, a movie theater, and a small park; and a northern portion with 190 townhomes. A similar redevelopment plan for the Port of Everett's 65 acres (26 ha) on the bayside waterfront, known as Port Gardner Wharf, was shelved in 2007 by the developer's financial issues. A new development, named Waterfront Place, began construction in 2018 with a hotel, apartments, restaurants, and shops adjacent to the city's public marina.

Providence Regional Medical Center, formed from a merger of Everett's two hospitals in 1994, completed a major expansion of its North Everett campus in 2011 by opening a 12-story medical tower. The first U.S. case of coronavirus disease 2019 was identified in a Snohomish County resident at Providence Regional Medical Center on January 20, 2020. As the coronavirus pandemic worsened in the state, mayor Cassie Franklin declared the first shelter-in-place order for Washington state on March 21, 2020. In response to a projected revenue shortfall of $14 million caused by the shelter-in-place order, which later spread statewide, the city government laid off 160 employees in May 2020 and plans to cut services. The city's original 2020 budget had already been constrained due to a projected deficit caused by a spending gap identified in 2017.

The first portions of the redeveloped Everett waterfront, a 142-room hotel, opened in 2019 and was followed by apartments and restaurants. The opening of the first apartment building was delayed due to a large fire in July 2020 that destroyed the entirety of the unfinished four-story structure. New residential buildings were also completed in downtown Everett and the waterfront, adding 650 apartments in the early 2020s. The Everett Housing Authority announced plans in 2024 to redevelop the 16-acre (6.5 ha) Baker Heights public housing complex into a mixed-income neighborhood with 1,500 residential units, offices, and retail with buildings as tall as 15 stories.

== Geography ==
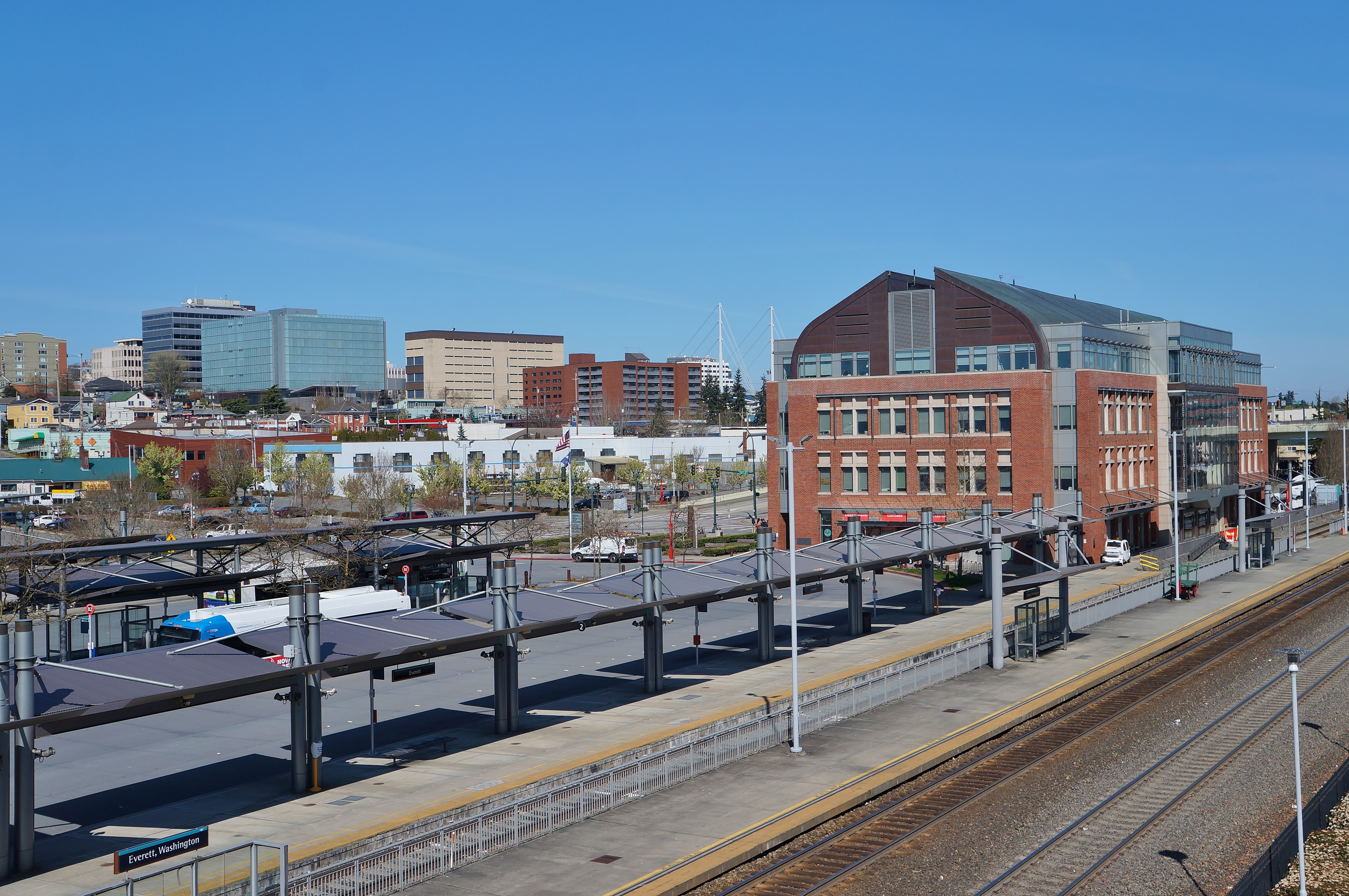
The skyline of Downtown Everett, seen from Everett Station

Everett is one of the core cities comprising the Seattle metropolitan area and is 25 miles (40 km) north of Seattle. It is primarily situated on the Port Gardner Peninsula, bordered to the west by Port Gardner Bay (part of Possession Sound in the Puget Sound estuary), and to the north and east by the Snohomish River delta. The city also encompasses suburban and industrial areas to the south and southwest of the peninsula, which were annexed during the mid-to-late 20th century. Everett has 11 miles (18 km) of freshwater shoreline and 11 miles (18 km) of saltwater shoreline, including public access points at parks and boat ramps on Port Gardner Bay and the Snohomish River. According to the United States Census Bureau, the city has a total area of 48.49 square miles (125.59 km^{2}), of which 33.45 square miles (86.64 km^{2}) is land and 15.04 square miles (38.95 km^{2}) is water.

The city's western boundary with Mukilteo is generally defined by Japanese Gulch on the edge of the Boeing Everett Assembly Plant and its auxiliary buildings. The southwestern edge of Everett borders an unincorporated area that includes Paine Field and the Lake Stickney/Mariner neighborhoods, which are part of the city's designated urban growth area that extends south towards Lynnwood. The southern boundary wraps around Silver Lake and follows State Route 527 to State Route 96 at Murphy's Corner, where it borders Mill Creek. Everett's boundaries follow various housing subdivisions in the Eastmont area before reaching the Snohomish River, which forms the primary eastern border. The northeastern boundary includes portions of Smith Island in the river delta reaching towards Marysville; a series of highway bridges connect Everett to Marysville to the north and Lake Stevens to the east by crossing the Snohomish River delta. The city boundaries also include 3,729 acres (1,509 ha) of forest surrounding Lake Chaplain, a reservoir in the Cascade Mountains that provides part of the municipal water supply.

The Port Gardner Peninsula was formed during the northward retreat of Vashon Glaciation during an ice age 14,000 years before present. The underlying soil is generally loamy and includes gravelly sand in the glacial outwash. Everett is near the Southern Whidbey Island Fault, a shallow earthquake fault zone that runs near the western edge of the city and was discovered in 1994. In the 1990s, local geologists also found evidence of a tsunami and soil liquefaction in deposits under the Snohomish River delta that were not directly connected to the South Whidbey Island Fault. The city government established its emergency management and preparedness office in 2002 and conducts regular disaster drills to simulate a potential response. The southwestern neighborhoods of Everett include several ravines formed by local creeks that drain into Port Gardner Bay. The area is also prone to mudslides that interrupt passenger and freight service on the railroad that runs along the coastline of the bay. Other areas of the city drain into the watersheds of the Snohomish River and Lake Washington.

=== Cityscape and neighborhoods ===
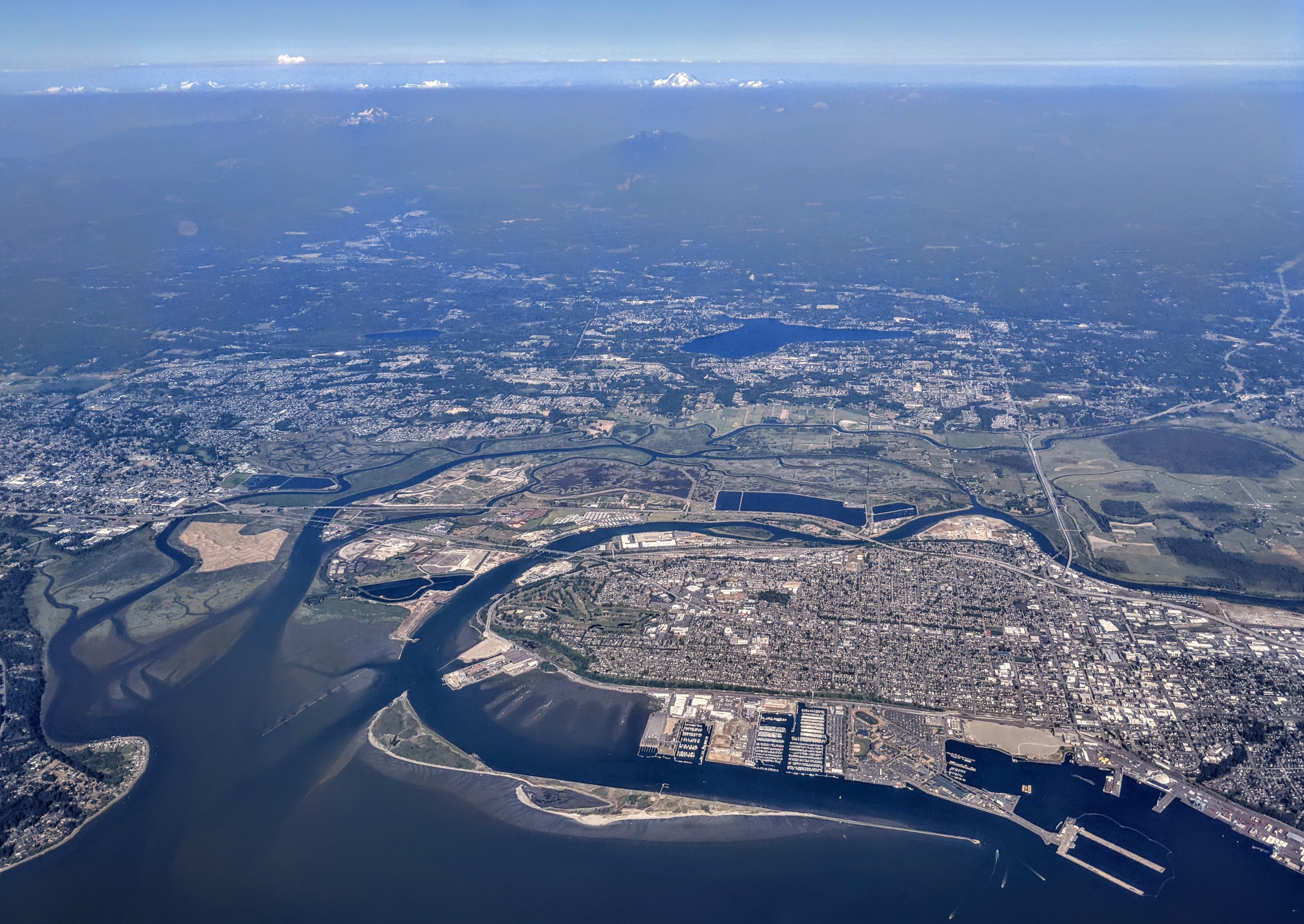
Aerial view of North Everett, with the Snohomish River delta in the center

The city of Everett maintains an Office of Neighborhoods which facilitates communication between the city and recognized neighborhood associations. The neighborhood associations are independent from the city and have elected leaders. Various neighborhoods in Everett have views of the Cascade and Olympic mountains, including Mount Baker and Mount Rainier.

As of 2019, Everett's 19 recognized neighborhood associations are:

- Bayside, which includes most of Downtown Everett, the Port of Everett, and Naval Station Everett, and surrounding residential areas.
- Boulevard Bluffs, a primarily residential area of the city bordering Mukilteo
- Cascade View, a residential area in South Everett, north of Everett Mall
- Delta, a primarily residential area north of Downtown Everett
- Evergreen, a primarily residential area in South Everett
- Glacier View, an older residential area south of downtown
- Harborview–Seahurst–Glenhaven, consisting of older residential areas south of downtown
- Holly, a mix of residential, commercial, and industrial areas on the southern edge of the city
- Lowell, a primarily residential area southeast of downtown and formerly an independent town founded in 1863
- Northwest Everett, which includes older residential areas northwest of downtown, a historic district, and the Everett Community College campus
- Pinehurst–Beverly Park, a mix of residential and commercial areas in South Everett
- Port Gardner, which includes parts of Downtown Everett and residential areas on Rucker Hill, a historic district
- Riverside, includes residential areas northeast of downtown and a historic district
- Silver Lake, includes residential and commercial areas surrounding Silver Lake in the extreme southeastern part of the city
- South Forest Park, a residential neighborhood near downtown
- Twin Creeks, which includes the area surrounding Everett Mall and a mix of residential and commercial areas.
- Valley View–Sylvan Crest–Larimer Ridge, residential areas in southeast Everett
- View Ridge–Madison, residential areas west and southwest of Forest Park
- Westmont, a primarily multi-family housing area in the southwestern part of the city

==== Downtown ====
Downtown Everett is generally defined as the area north of Pacific Avenue, east of West Marine View Drive, south of Everett Avenue, and west of Broadway. It is home to city and county government offices, high-rise office buildings, hotels, and apartment buildings. The Angel of the Winds Arena is on the west side of Broadway, anchoring a small historic district on Hewitt Avenue. Several downtown streets are named for the founders of the Everett Land Company and their associates, including John D. Rockefeller, the Rucker Brothers, Charles L. Colby, and shipbuilder Alexander McDougall.

The city government approved plans in 2018 to allow for high-rise buildings as tall as 25 stories and with reduced parking requirements to encourage denser development in anticipation of a future Link light rail station. In the early 2020s, several apartment buildings with a combined 650 units were completed in downtown and the waterfront district.

=== Climate ===
Everett generally has an oceanic climate similar to most of the Puget Sound lowlands, with year-round moderate temperatures influenced by marine air masses. The variation of normal weather between seasons is less extreme than inland areas, with dry summers and mild, rainy winters due to the proximity of the Pacific Ocean. Under the Köppen climate classification system, Everett is described as having a warm-summer Mediterranean climate (Csb). The city marks the north end of the Puget Sound Convergence Zone, a local weather phenomenon caused by colliding air currents from the region's mountain ranges that produces heavier rain and stronger winds than the rest of the region.

The warmest month for Everett is August, with average high temperatures of 72.7 °F (22.6 °C), while January is the coolest, at an average high of 44.9 °F (7.2 °C). The highest recorded temperature at Paine Field, 100 °F (38 °C), first occurred on July 29, 2009; it was tied on August 16, 2020, and tied again on June 28, 2021, during a regional heat wave. The lowest, 0 °F (−18 °C), occurred on November 11, 1993. The city receives 35.71 inches (907 mm) of annual rainfall, which mostly falls from October to March and peaks in December. Everett rarely receives significant snowfall and its highest total, 26.6 inches (68 cm), occurred in 1965.

Climate data for Everett, Washington (1991–2020 normals, extremes 1894–present)
Month	Jan	Feb	Mar	Apr	May	Jun	Jul	Aug	Sep	Oct	Nov	Dec	Year
Record high °F (°C)	72 (22)	74 (23)	82 (28)	87 (31)	93 (34)	101 (38)	93 (34)	100 (38)	90 (32)	83 (28)	74 (23)	66 (19)	101 (38)
Mean maximum °F (°C)	57.8 (14.3)	60.0 (15.6)	67.2 (19.6)	73.3 (22.9)	78.9 (26.1)	81.9 (27.7)	85.6 (29.8)	86.1 (30.1)	80.4 (26.9)	72.9 (22.7)	62.6 (17.0)	56.0 (13.3)	89.2 (31.8)
Mean daily maximum °F (°C)	47.6 (8.7)	50.7 (10.4)	54.4 (12.4)	59.8 (15.4)	65.6 (18.7)	69.8 (21.0)	74.9 (23.8)	75.4 (24.1)	70.3 (21.3)	60.8 (16.0)	52.1 (11.2)	46.7 (8.2)	60.3 (15.7)
Daily mean °F (°C)	41.0 (5.0)	42.6 (5.9)	45.9 (7.7)	50.5 (10.3)	56.1 (13.4)	60.6 (15.9)	65.0 (18.3)	65.0 (18.3)	60.0 (15.6)	52.1 (11.2)	44.5 (6.9)	40.5 (4.7)	52.1 (11.2)
Mean daily minimum °F (°C)	34.6 (1.4)	34.5 (1.4)	37.3 (2.9)	41.3 (5.2)	46.7 (8.2)	51.6 (10.9)	55.0 (12.8)	54.8 (12.7)	49.5 (9.7)	43.5 (6.4)	36.8 (2.7)	34.3 (1.3)	43.5 (6.4)
Mean minimum °F (°C)	22.7 (−5.2)	25.0 (−3.9)	28.8 (−1.8)	33.7 (0.9)	37.9 (3.3)	45.5 (7.5)	49.0 (9.4)	48.4 (9.1)	41.3 (5.2)	32.3 (0.2)	25.5 (−3.6)	22.6 (−5.2)	18.9 (−7.3)
Record low °F (°C)	1 (−17)	2 (−17)	10 (−12)	23 (−5)	29 (−2)	36 (2)	37 (3)	38 (3)	30 (−1)	22 (−6)	8 (−13)	5 (−15)	1 (−17)
Average precipitation inches (mm)	4.58 (116)	3.48 (88)	4.26 (108)	3.22 (82)	2.55 (65)	2.26 (57)	1.04 (26)	0.93 (24)	1.89 (48)	3.75 (95)	5.56 (141)	5.28 (134)	39.67 (1,008)
Average precipitation days (≥ 0.01 in.)	18.6	14.9	20.3	17.2	12.8	12.9	6.2	5.5	9.4	17.7	16.0	18.5	170.0
Source 1: NOAA
Source 2: National Weather Service

== Economy ==
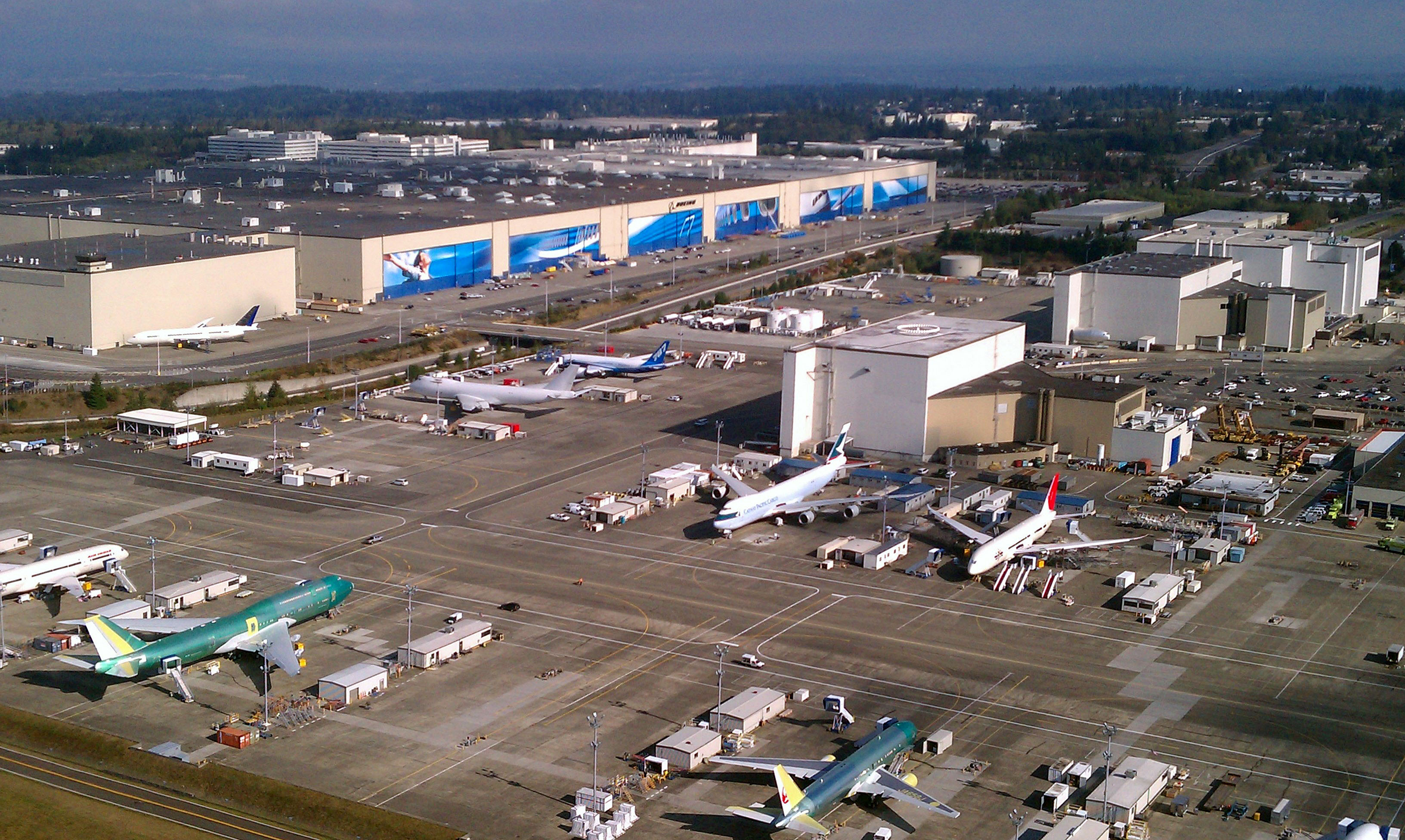
The Boeing Everett Factory, the largest employer in Snohomish County

Everett has a workforce population of 88,146 people with 59,599 who are employed, according to a 2018 estimate from the U.S. Census Bureau. The city also had an estimated 7,335 registered businesses in 2012 providing 94,000 jobs. Everett's economy is centered around aerospace manufacturing, maritime activities, the technology sector, and the service industry. The largest employer in the city is airplane manufacturer Boeing, with 31 percent of all jobs. The company's main manufacturing plant near Paine Field is the world's largest building by volume. The local economy of Everett and Snohomish County is heavily affected by Boeing's performance, with layoffs and strikes causing downturns in other industries.

The city's economy in the 19th and early 20th centuries was tied to the lumber trade and maritime industries, including fishing and boat manufacturing. Everett's last remaining wood pulp mill, owned by Kimberly-Clark, shut down in April 2012 and was demolished a year later, marking the end of the lumber economy's dominance. The aerospace industry in Everett began growing in the late 1960s after Boeing began constructing its assembly plant at Paine Field, bringing suppliers and subcontractors to the area. Since the 1990s, the city government has encouraged economic development in other industries to add diversity, particularly in the technology sector. The Port of Everett has also developed its own industrial park in North Everett that is home to an aerospace supplier and distribution centers for Amazon and FedEx.

As of 2018, the largest industry in Everett is manufacturing, with 18 percent of residents employed there, followed by educational services (18%), retail (12%), professional services (11%), and entertainment (11%). Electronics manufacturer Fluke Corporation (now part of Fortive) is based in Everett and has 1,000 employees in Washington state. Toymaker Funko is also headquartered in Downtown Everett, where it has its own retail store that opened in 2017, and operates a distribution center in the city. Electric motor manufacturer MagniX moved its headquarters from Redmond to Everett in 2021, which was followed by a research facility that was relocated from Australia. In 2020, Bellevue-based TerraPower opened a research facility near Paine Field to develop smaller nuclear reactors for use in power plants. Other large employers in Everett include the Providence Regional Medical Center with 4,900 employees, the U.S. Navy with 2,900 employees, and Everett Public Schools with 2,440 employees.

Approximately 28 percent of Everett workers are employed at businesses within the city limits, while 15 percent commute to Seattle. The majority of the city's employed residents (70%) commute to work in single-occupant vehicles, while 14 percent use carpools and 6 percent use public transportation. Everett workplaces have employees who live across Snohomish and King counties, with 15 percent from within the city, 7 percent from Marysville, 5 percent from Seattle, and 4 percent from Lake Stevens. The changing of first shift at the Boeing facility in Everett causes a spike in traffic congestion during the mornings and early afternoons that spills out from freeways onto local streets.

The city's retailers had total sales of $2 billion in 2012 and are concentrated along two major highways, Evergreen Way and Everett Mall Way, in strip malls and standalone big-box stores. The intersection of the two corridors is home to a large auto row that developed in the 1980s after dealerships relocated from Downtown Everett. The Everett Mall opened in 1974 and has over 100 stores. The mall was expanded in 2005, adding a movie theater and a new set of stores, but has since lost two major retailers and several other tenants.

=== Largest employers ===
Largest employers in Everett, Washington (as of 2022)
Rank	Employer	Number of employees	
Rank	Employer	2022	2013
1	Boeing	29,630	39,000
2	Providence Regional Medical Center Everett	7,350	3,500
3	Naval Station Everett	4,300	6,000
4	State of Washington	3,261	6,000
5	Snohomish County	2,877	2,500
6	The Everett Clinic/Optum	2,639	2,100
7	Everett Public Schools	2,522	1,900
8	City of Everett	1,194	1,200
9	Fluke Corporation (Fortive)	960	1,100

== Demographics ==
Historical population
Census	Pop.	Note	%±
1900	7,838		—
1910	24,814		216.6%
1920	27,644		11.4%
1930	30,567		10.6%
1940	30,224		−1.1%
1950	33,849		12.0%
1960	40,304		19.1%
1970	53,622		33.0%
1980	54,413		1.5%
1990	69,961		28.6%
2000	91,488		30.8%
2010	103,019		12.6%
2020	110,629		7.4%
2024 (est.)	113,011		2.2%
Sources: U.S. Decennial Census

Everett is the largest city in Snohomish County and the seventh largest in Washington state by population, ranking between Kent and Renton. It had a population of 110,629 at the time of the 2020 U.S. census. The city's urban growth area has a population of 44,596 residents as of 2016 that are part of unincorporated Snohomish County. Everett's population grew by 47 percent from 1990 to 2000 and 13 percent from 2000 to 2010, due to annexations and increased housing development. It is projected to increase by 40,000 to 60,000 residents by 2035 as part of state-mandated growth plans. The city's population growth since 1990 has largely been driven by non-Caucasian racial groups, with the white majority decreasing from 92 percent in 1990 to 75 percent in 2010.

The city had 16,394 housing units in 2010, 9,181 of which were single-family homes and 7,213 of which were in multi-family housing. Everett's homeownership rate is among the lowest in Washington, with 44 percent of homes occupied by their owners, and its residents have a low median income relative to the county and Seattle metropolitan area. The average monthly rent for housing units in Everett in 2013 ranged from $700 for a studio apartment to $2,723 for a five-bedroom home. The city also has several affordable housing complexes that provide 2,461 units to low-income households through federal and local grants.

Racial and ethnic composition in the U.S. census
Race / Ethnicity (Note: The United States Census Bureau classifies Hispanic/Latino as an ethnicity and assigns them to a separate category. Hispanics/Latinos may be of any race.)	2000	2010	2020
White alone (non-Hispanic)	71,276 (77.91%)	70,489 (68.42%)	64,791 (58.57%)
Black or African American alone (non-Hispanic)	2,966 (3.24%)	3,921 (3.81%)	5,716 (5.17%)
Native American or Alaska Native alone (non-Hispanic)	1,302 (1.42%)	1,129 (1.10%)	925 (0.84%)
Asian alone (non-Hispanic)	5,710 (6.24%)	7,949 (7.72%)	10,485 (9.48%)
Pacific Islander alone (non-Hispanic)	299 (0.33%)	712 (0.69%)	1,439 (1.30%)
Other race alone (non-Hispanic)	150 (0.16%)	170 (0.17%)	591 (0.53%)
Mixed race or multi-racial (non-Hispanic)	3,246 (3.55%)	4,054 (3.94%)	7,599 (6.87%)
Hispanic or Latino (any race)	6,539 (7.15%)	14,595 (14.17%)	19,083 (17.25%)
Total	91,488	103,019	110,629

=== 2020 census ===
As of the 2020 U.S. census, there were 110,629 people and 44,879 total households living within Everett's city limits. The city's population density was 2,309.1 inhabitants per square mile (891.5/km^{2}). There were 47,193 total housing units, of which 95.1% were occupied and 4.9% were vacant or for occasional use. The racial makeup of Everett was 61.7% White, 5.4% Black or African American, 1.3% Native American or Alaska Native, 9.6% Asian, 1.3% Native Hawaiian or Pacific Islander, and 8.9% from other races. Residents who identified as more than one race were 11.9% of the population. Hispanic or Latino residents of any race were 17.2% of the population.

Of the 44,879 households in Everett, 37.4% were married couples living together and 9.7% were cohabitating but unmarried. Households with a male householder with no spouse or partner were 24.8% of the population, while households with a female householder with no spouse or partner were 28.0% of the population. Out of all households, 27.1% had children under the age of 18 living with them and 24.9% had residents who were 65 years of age or older. There were 44,879 occupied housing units in Everett, of which 45.2% were owner-occupied and 54.8% were occupied by renters.

The median age in the city was 36.7 years old for all sexes, 35.8 years old for males, and 37.8 years old for females. Of the total population, 22.8% of residents were under the age of 19; 31.9% were between the ages of 20 and 39; 31.3% were between the ages of 48 and 64; and 13.7% were 65 years of age or older. The gender makeup of the city was 50.5% male and 49.5% female.

=== 2010 census ===
As of the 2010 U.S. census, there were 103,019 people, 41,312 households, and 23,282 families residing in the city. The population density was 3,079.8 inhabitants per square mile (1,189.1/km^{2}). There were 44,609 housing units at an average density of 1,333.6 per square mile (514.9/km^{2}). The racial makeup of the city was 74.6% White, 4.1% African American, 1.4% Native American, 7.8% Asian, 0.7% Pacific Islander, 6.1% from other races, and 5.3% from two or more races. Hispanic or Latino people of any race were 14.2% of the population.

There were 41,312 households, of which 30.5% had children under the age of 18 living with them, 38.2% were married couples living together, 12.5% had a female householder with no husband present, 5.7% had a male householder with no wife present, and 43.6% were non-families. 34.1% of all households were made up of individuals, and 9.3% had someone living alone who was 65 years of age or older. The average household size was 2.39 and the average family size was 3.09.

The median age in the city was 34.4 years. 22.7% of residents were under the age of 18; 11.3% were between the ages of 18 and 24; 30.6% were from 25 to 44; 25% were from 45 to 64; and 10.3% were 65 years of age or older. The gender makeup of the city was 50.9% male and 49.1% female.

=== Crime ===
Everett
- Crime rates* (2024)

Violent crimes
- Homicide: 56
- Rape: 36
- Robbery: 75
- Aggravated assault: 178

Property crimes
- Burglary: 395
- Larceny-theft: 2,293
- Motor vehicle theft: 894
- Arson: 18
- Note: Reported crimes per 100,000 population Source: 2024 FBI Crime Data Explorer

The Everett Police Department is budgeted for 219 uniformed officers and 37 civilian employees in 2025. The number of reported crimes in Everett has declined since reaching a peak in 2009–10, with 610 violent crimes and 7,672 property crimes. Everett had ranked in the top 20 percent of U.S. cities for reported crimes in reports by CQ Press, which included property crimes and burglary among violent crimes. It was ranked 49th among cities in Washington for crimes per capita in a 2019 study by the National Council for Home Safety and Security.

The Everett Police Department and Snohomish County Sheriff's Office began criminal investigations against operators and employees of various bikini barista coffee stands in 2009 for violating adult entertainment laws. The city government passed a dress code ordinance for food service workers in August 2017, but were met with a lawsuit from stand operators and employees over the constitutionality of the ordinance. The ordinance was suspended by a preliminary injunction from the U.S. District Court of Western Washington in December 2017, but the Ninth Circuit Court of Appeals ruled in favor of the city government in 2019. After the U.S. Supreme Court declined a petition from the plaintiffs to hear the case in March 2020, it was referred back to the U.S. District Court, where the ordinance was ruled unconstitutional in October 2022; both sides settled in April 2023, with the city agreeing to pay $500,000 to the plaintiffs while rolling back the scope of the ordinance to align it with existing municipal legislation on lewd conduct.

The city has a high rate of opioid abuse, particularly OxyContin and heroin, fueled by cross-state drug trafficking. The Providence Regional Medical Center reported 655 patients with opioid overdoses from January to August 2017, while 34 percent of residents booked into the county jail tested positive for opioids. The widespread opioid use also contributed to a 65 percent rise in homelessness in Everett from 2015 to 2017, straining local shelters and supportive housing systems. The city government filed a lawsuit against OxyContin manufacturer Purdue Pharma in January 2017, claiming that the company had been grossly negligent in distributing the drug and containing its effect on Everett residents. The lawsuit also identified a drug trafficking ring based in Los Angeles, large prescriptions by doctors to procure the drug, and direct marketing by Purdue Pharma as contributing factors to the rise in opioid cases. Everett's lawsuit was joined by complaints from other jurisdictions, including Snohomish County and the Tulalip Tribes, and was heard in the U.S. District Court of Northern Ohio.

== Government and politics ==
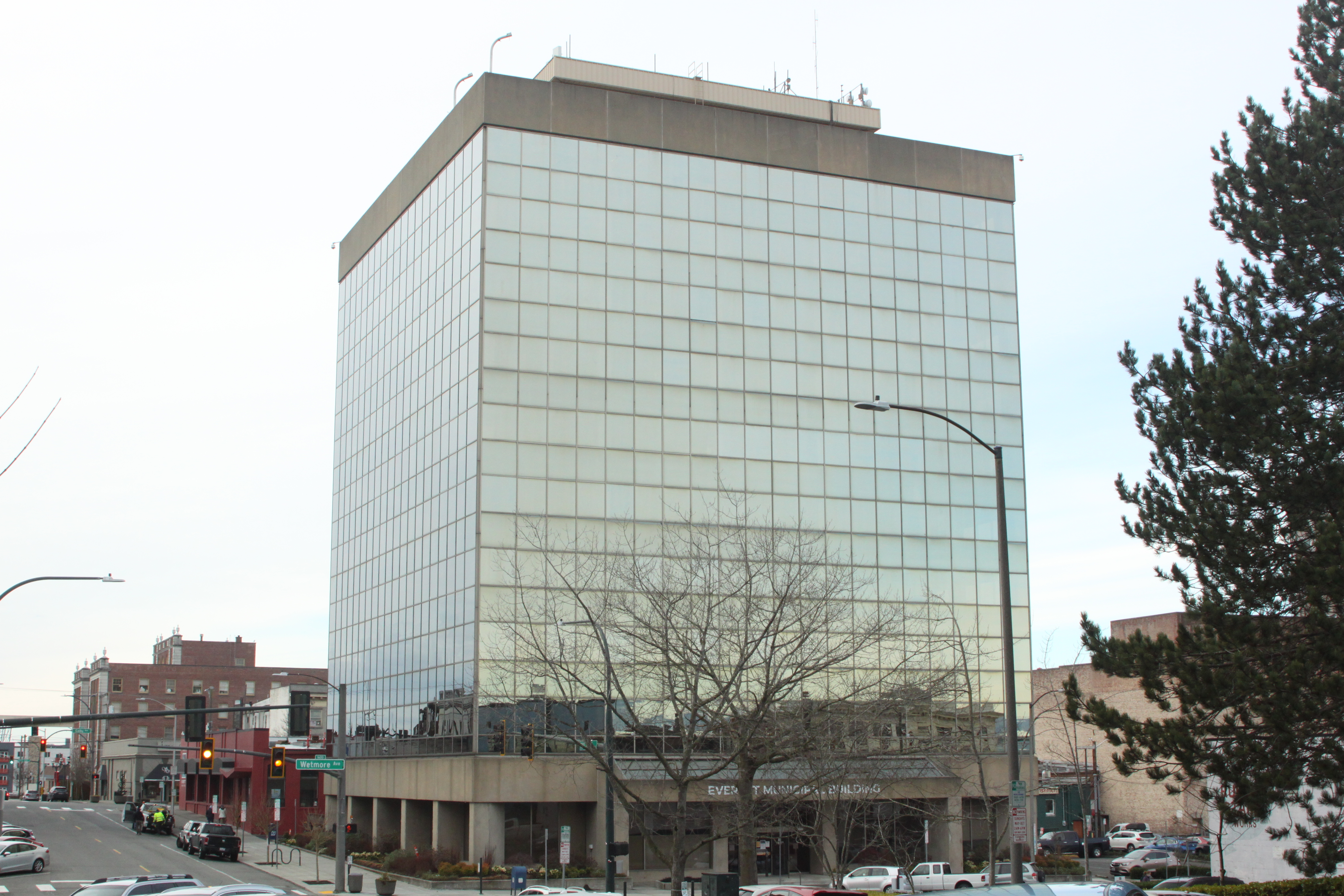
The Everett Municipal Building, which serves as the city hall

Everett is a first-class city with an organized charter and a mayor–council government. The city's mayor and seven councilmembers are elected to four-year terms in staggered elections that take place during odd-numbered years. The city council has five positions elected from the city's districts, which were implemented in 2021, while the remaining two positions are at-large seats. The city council meets weekly on Wednesdays and offers live television and web broadcasts via The Everett Channel. The city government is based out of the Everett Municipal Building (formerly known as the Wall Street Building) in Downtown Everett, a 10-story office tower opened in 1980 and also home to other federal and state government agencies. The building is adjacent to the historic Everett City Hall, which is home to the city police department and city council chambers.

Cassie Franklin, a former city councilmember, was elected as mayor in 2017 and is the second woman and first non-appointee to hold the office. The mayor of Everett is responsible for appointing the heads of various city departments, the city clerk, the city treasurer, the police and fire chiefs, and members of service commissions and boards. The city government has 1,262 employee positions (full-time equivalent) and an operating budget of $612.8 million for 2026. It provides a range of municipal services, including police, fire, emergency medical services, public works, a housing authority, zoning and planning, parks and recreation, and some utilities. The city government has had annual budget deficits since 2001 due to a state limit on property tax increases that has prevented additional revenue from being raised. Everett's municipal court was established in 1987 and has two judges who are elected to four-year terms. The city government runs its own public transit and library systems, which are separate from the countywide Community Transit and Sno-Isle Libraries.

Everett is also the county seat of Snohomish County and houses several major government facilities on a campus in Downtown Everett. The campus includes the county courthouse, county jail, administrative offices, and the main precinct of the county sheriff.

At the federal level, Everett is part of the 2nd congressional district, represented by Democrat Rick Larsen since 2001. At the state level, most of the city is in the 38th legislative district alongside Marysville and the Tulalip Indian Reservation. The southwestern neighborhoods of the city are part of the 21st legislative district, shared with Edmonds and Mukilteo; the Silver Lake neighborhood is part of the 44th legislative district, which also includes Mill Creek and Snohomish. Everett is also part of the Snohomish County Council's 2nd district, which also includes Mukilteo and the Tulalip Indian Reservation.

== Culture ==
=== Arts ===
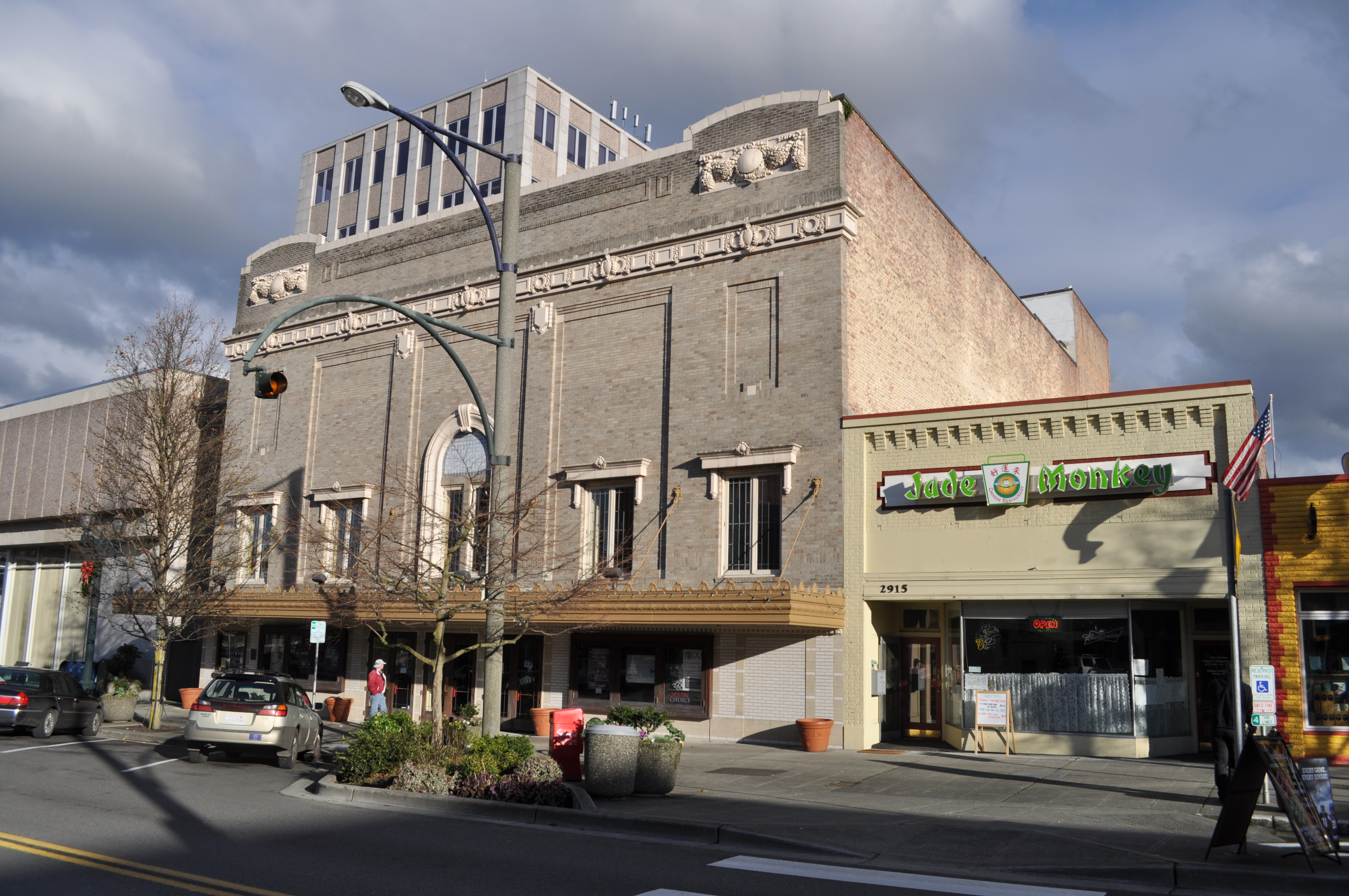
The Historic Everett Theatre, opened in 1901

Everett is described as a "largely blue-collar city", but is home to a regional arts scene that includes galleries, community theaters, music, and artwork. The city has five major performing arts venues that host various groups and traveling events.

The 834-seat Historic Everett Theatre on Colby Avenue opened in 1901 and hosts community theater productions, musical groups, improv comedy, and film screenings. The city once had a "theater district" in downtown that included the Everett, Granada, Balboa, and Roxy theaters, all opened during the early 20th century, but the district later declined with two closures in the 1950s. The Everett Theatre is the last surviving theater from the era, having been partially rebuilt following a fire in December 1923, renovated into a triplex theater in 1979, closed in 1989, and restored to its original state beginning in 2000. The regional Village Theatre performs in Issaquah and at the Everett Performing Arts Center, a city-owned facility that opened in 1993 and is also home to the Everett Chorale. The Village Theatre opened KidStage, a venue for young performers, in 2011 by converting a former bank branch building adjacent to the Everett Performing Arts Center. The Everett Civic Auditorium at Everett High School was completed in 1939 and is home to the Everett Philharmonic Orchestra, which was formed in 2010 by musicians from the former Everett Symphony after it ran into financial issues.

The city's public art program is managed by the Everett Cultural Arts Commission, a citizen advisory board established in 1974 alongside a percent for art program for public projects. In addition to public art, the commission manages 16 street pianos in Downtown Everett that are painted by local artists and available for public use every August. Everett's main arts district is on a three-block section of Hoyt Avenue in downtown, which is home to the Schack Art Center and several sculptures installed in the late 2000s. The Schack Art Center opened in 2011 as a multipurpose exhibition space and artist workshop, with facilities for various mediums and housing for artists provided by Artspace. The center was originally the Arts Council of Snohomish County and named in honor of John and Idamae Schack, longtime supporters of the organization and arts in the region; in its first year, the Schack Art Center had 265 artists on exhibit and 33,000 visitors, helping to revitalize downtown during the Great Recession. The Everett area has attracted artists and musicians from Seattle due to its relative affordability and incentives from the city government.

The Everett area has been featured in several film and television productions, both as a setting and as a film location. It was the setting for the 2014 crime film 7 Minutes and the 2000 television series The Fugitive. The television series Twin Peaks, which was primarily filmed in North Bend, used an Everett house for interior shots.

=== Events and tourism ===
The city hosts several annual events and festivals, usually during the summer months. The city's waterfront hosts an annual fireworks display on Independence Day a few hours after a downtown parade. Several major events were established in the 1990s and run on an annual schedule. These include a film festival in February, the Cruzin' to Colby classic car show in May, the Sorticulture garden festival in June, Nubian Jam at Forest Park in July, and the Fresh Paint art show in August. The city's largest annual summer festival, the Salty Sea Days, was established in 1970 and included a parade, hydroplane races, a classic auto show, and other events. It was originally subsidized using city lodging taxes until 2003, and shut down three years later.

The Everett Farmers Market began in 1994 and operates on Sundays from May to October with 200 vendors and about 5,000 weekly visitors. It was originally located at the Port of Everett but moved in 2019 to Wetmore Avenue in downtown because of parking and accessibility issues at the waterfront site. The farmers market also operates popup bazaars during the off-season and a Wednesday market at Everett Station during the summer. The waterfront remains home to a summer concert series that has been staged annually since 1991. Boxcar Park on the waterfront hosted four official watch parties during the 2026 FIFA World Cup that drew 17,000 total spectators.

Everett's government and the Everett Downtown Association have also launched tourism initiatives that have created new events and promotional branding for Everett. The city government launched a logo design contest in 2014 that had 850 entries and 5,700 votes from local residents. The winning design was later withdrawn due to its similarity to the logo of financial services company Envestnet and was replaced by a new brand design in 2019. A craft beer festival was established in 2012 by the Washington Beer Commission and was later renamed to the Upper Left Beerfest in 2017 after the city government took over operations. The Fisherman's Village Music Festival took place annually over a three-day weekend in May at four stages in Downtown Everett between 2014 and 2025. The music festival included performances from 50 local and national artists as well as art exhibitions until it was cancelled in 2026. An annual 3-on-3 basketball tournament was established in 2022 and takes place on downtown streets during a July weekend. The city's first Pride parade and block party began in 2023 and is held annually in June.

The Everett area has several major tourist attractions, particularly those themed around aviation. The Future of Flight Aviation Center at Paine Field, owned by the county government and operated by Boeing, has several aviation exhibits and includes a tour of the Boeing assembly plant. It is the most popular tourist attraction in Snohomish County, with 495,000 visitors in 2017. The Flying Heritage & Combat Armor Museum opened in 2008 at a renovated Paine Field hangar and houses a collection of restored 20th century military planes and vehicles. The Imagine Children's Museum opened in 2004 at a renovated bank building in Downtown Everett after relocating from Marysville. It has interactive exhibits designed to teach children about local history, science, and the arts.

=== Media ===
The Everett Herald is the city's daily newspaper, providing local and national news for 40,000 subscribers in Snohomish County. It began publication on February 11, 1901, emerging as the city's lone daily newspaper from a field of three competitors established in the early 1890s: the Everett News, Everett Times, and Everett Tribune. The newspaper remained under local ownership until it was purchased by The Washington Post Company in 1978 and it was sold to Sound Publishing in 2013. The Herald launched its online website on January 5, 1997, the monthly Herald Business Journal in 1998, and began publishing a weekly Spanish-language newspaper, La Raza del Noroeste, in April 2006. My Everett News is an independent online news outlet for Everett that was established in 2011 and is affiliated with The Seattle Times.

The city is part of the Seattle–Tacoma media market, ranked 13th among U.S. metro areas, which includes several major television and radio stations. KONG-TV, a Seattle-based broadcast channel that is affiliated with KING-TV, has been licensed to Everett since 1984 and debuted in 1997. The City of Everett also runs The Everett Channel (formerly Everett TV), a government-access television station that broadcasts local events, city meetings, and special programming. Everett itself has four radio stations. The Skotdal family owns two stations in Everett that share facilities with the Everett Post: KRKO-AM, which began broadcasting in 1922 and primary plays classic hits along with local sports; and KKXA-AM, a country music station launched in 2011. KSER-FM is an independent public radio station founded in 1991 to serve Snohomish County, carrying local news, music programming, and nationally syndicated news. Everett is also home to KWYZ-AM (Radio Hankook), a Korean language news and entertainment station that launched in 1997 and is broadcast from Federal Way.

=== Libraries ===
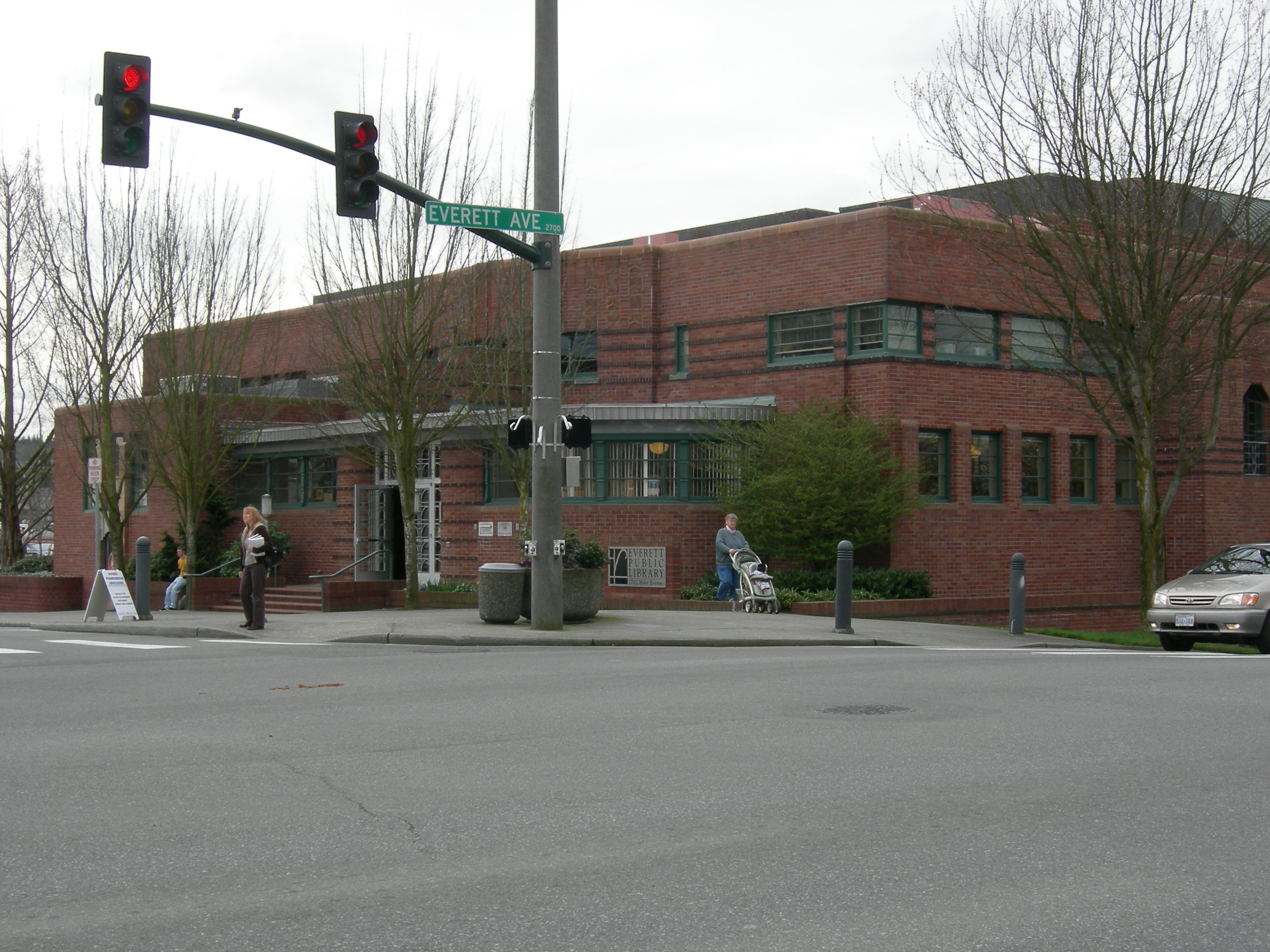
The Everett Public Library in Downtown Everett, built in 1934 and renovated in 1991

The Everett Public Library system has two locations with 258,133 total items and serves 45,205 registered members in the city and surrounding communities as of 2018. The library was founded in 1894 and moved into a permanent building in 1905. The current downtown library opened in 1934 and was expanded in 1991; a branch library in South Everett opened in 1985 and was renovated in 2019. In 2017, Sno-Isle Libraries, the countywide library system, opened a demonstration branch at a strip mall in South Everett to serve the Mariner area. Sno-Isle's permanent Mariner branch is planned to begin construction in 2026 as part of a mixed-use development in the neighborhood.

=== Historic preservation ===
Everett is home to 14 properties listed on the National Register of Historic Places. The city maintains its own register of historic places that began in 1987 and has 35 listed properties. A non-profit preservation group, Historic Everett, was founded in 2002 and hosts educational events and tours of the city.

In addition to historic properties, the city has several designated historic districts: Hewitt Avenue Historic District in Downtown Everett; the Rucker Hill Historic District; and the Swalwell Block. Several historic overlay districts are designated by the city government, including the Riverside Overlay, the Norton–Grand Overlay, and the Rucker–Grand Overlay, which includes the home of the former U.S. Senator Henry M. Jackson. Several properties within the historic districts have undergone renovation and restoration work in the 21st century to preserve their historic value, partially in response to the demolition of other buildings for new construction.

The Everett Museum of History was established in 1953 as a countywide historical association and maintained its own museum until 2007. The organization's collections were then moved to several buildings for storage, including the former Everett Carnegie Library and part of the Everett Mall, while a permanent location was sought. A new museum at the former downtown offices of the Everett Herald is planned to open in 2021, using donated funds to purchase and renovate the building.

=== Sports ===
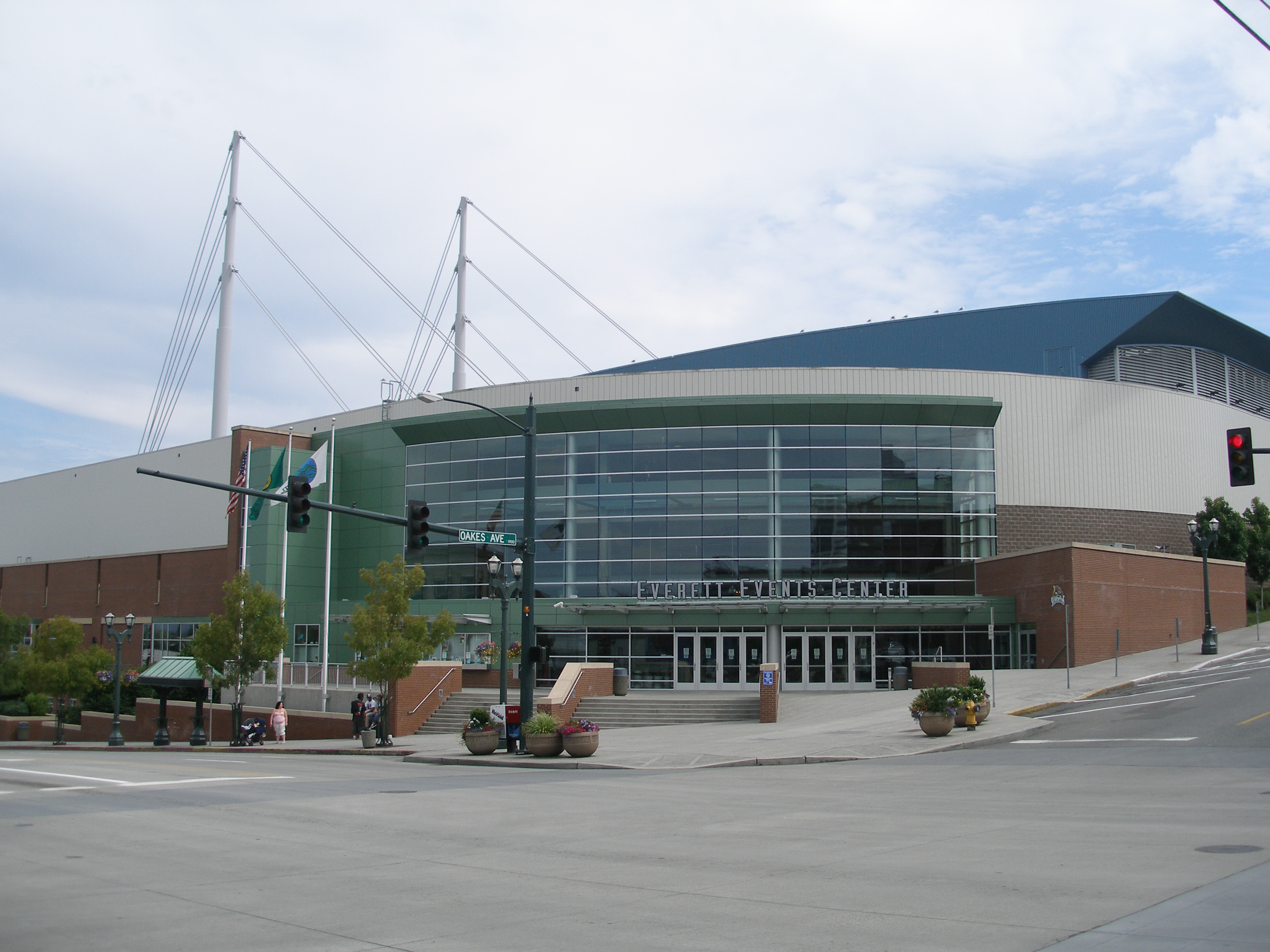
The Angel of the Winds Arena, opened in 2003 for the Everett Silvertips and other teams

Everett is home to two sports venues that are used by professional minor league teams and for other events. The Angel of the Winds Arena, an indoor arena in downtown which seats 8,149, is home to the Everett Silvertips of the Western Hockey League. It opened in 2003 at a cost of $83 million and includes a community ice rink and a convention center for use by other events. The Silvertips are a junior hockey team that has played since 2003 and won their first league championship in 2026. Angel of the Winds Arena has also hosted the Seattle Storm of the WNBA for several seasons, indoor tennis events, and three editions of the Skate America figure skating championships.

The Everett AquaSox (formerly the Giants) are part of the Northwest League and play at Funko Field, a 3,682-seat baseball stadium that is part of the Everett Memorial Stadium complex. The stadium is also home to the Everett Merchants, a summer collegiate team that plays in the Pacific International League. The Memorial Stadium complex was built in 1947 and includes a 12,000-seat football and track stadium that is used by the city's various high school teams. The Aquasox announced in 2021 that it plans to renovate Funko Field or build a new ballpark in Downtown Everett with funding from the city government to comply with new Minor League Baseball standards. The new downtown ballpark would be constructed by 2027 and drew interest from the United Soccer League for a potential minor-league professional men's and women's teams.

The city formerly had additional indoor sports teams who played in minor leagues: the Snohomish County Explosion, which played from 2007 to 2010 in the defunct International Basketball League and later the National Athletic Basketball League; the Everett Hawks of the National Indoor Football League and AF2, who folded in 2007; the Everett Raptors of the Indoor Football League, who played for one season in 2012; and the Washington Stealth of the National Lacrosse League, who moved to British Columbia in 2014. A new arena football franchise, the Washington Wolfpack, was established in 2023 and began play in 2024.

Everett has also hosted several minor league soccer teams, including the Everett BigFoot of the third-division USISL Pro League, who began play in 1995 and moved to West Seattle in 1997. The North Sound SeaWolves of the USL Premier Development League began play at Mariner High School in 2011 and moved to Edmonds the following season. Everett Jets FC are an amateur team in the Evergreen Premier League who were set to begin their inaugural season in 2020 at Memorial Stadium until the COVID-19 pandemic suspended league play. They debuted in 2021 and play home matches at Archbishop Murphy High School after moving from Mariner High School.

The Seattle Spartans, a women's football team that plays in the Women's Football Alliance, was founded in 2012 and originally named the Everett Reign. The team plays its home games at Mariner High School.

Sports teams from Everett, Washington
Club	Sport	League	Existed	Venue	Championships
Everett AquaSox	Baseball	Northwest League	1984–present	Funko Field	1985, 2010, 2025
Everett Hawks	Arena football	Indoor Football League	2002–2007	Everett Events Center	
Everett Jets FC	Soccer	Evergreen Premier League	2021–present	Archbishop Murphy High School	
Everett Raptors	Arena football	National Indoor Football League, af2	2012	Comcast Arena	
Everett Silvertips	Hockey	Western Hockey League	2003–present	Angel of the Winds Arena	2025–26
Seattle Spartans	American football	Women's Football Alliance	2012–present	Mariner High School	
Snohomish County Explosion	Basketball	International Basketball League, National Athletic Basketball League	2007–2010	Angel of the Winds Arena	
Washington Stealth	Box lacrosse	National Lacrosse League	2010–2013	Comcast Arena	2010
Washington Wolfpack	Arena football	Arena Football One	2023–present	Angel of the Winds Arena	

== Parks and recreation ==
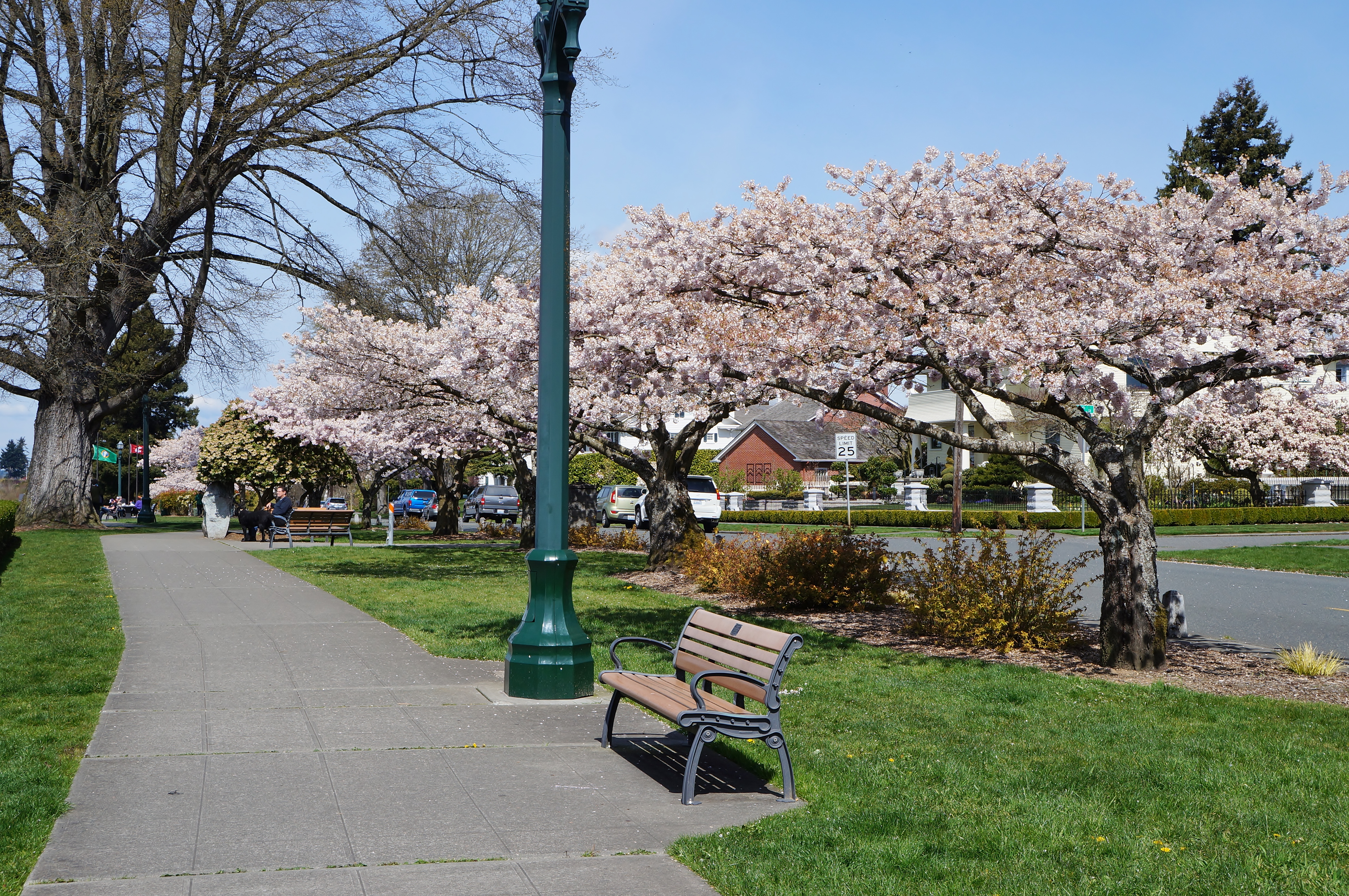
Grand Avenue Park in northwestern Everett

Everett has more than 40 parks, trails, golf courses, and playgrounds maintained by the city government's Parks and Recreation Department. The department manages a total of 693 acres (280 ha) of land, with most areas set aside for nature conservation and others developed for use by residents and visitors. The department also organizes recreational activities at city parks and throughout the city, including sports leagues, swimming lessons, hiking trips, and classes on cooking and gardening.

The city's first park, now known as Clark Park, was established in 1894 and functioned as a town square with regular concerts and protests until its bandstand was demolished in 1979. The largest park in Everett, Forest Park, was acquired in late 1894 and was left largely undeveloped until the 1930s. The parks system includes several facilities with sports fields and courts, including Garfield Park, Kasch Park, Henry M. Jackson Park, and Phil Johnson Ballfields. The city operates two public golf courses at American Legion Memorial Park (opened in 1934) and Walter E. Hall Park (opened in 1972). A private golf course, the Everett Golf & Country Club, was established in 1910 on 66 acres (27 ha) south of downtown.

The municipal parks system includes several miles of public shoreline access at Howarth Park on Port Gardner Bay, Rotary Park and Langus Riverfront Park on the Snohomish River, and Thornton A. Sullivan Park on Silver Lake. The shoreline parks have public beaches and boat launches for recreational boating. The Port of Everett has a large public marina and its own boat launch at 10th Street that also serves a ferry to Jetty Island. The state and county governments also maintain their own parks in the Everett area, including the jointly maintained Spencer Island Regional Park. The city government is also responsible for maintaining a section of the Interurban Trail, which connects Everett to Lynnwood, Mountlake Terrace, Shoreline, and Seattle. North Everett is ringed by the Mill Town Trail, a six-mile (9.7 km) multi-use pathway with interpretive signs to commemorate the city's industrial history.

Everett's senior center first opened on June 1, 1965, in the Louie's Dance Hall building on Rockefeller Avenue with support from the county chapter of United Good Neighbors. The Rockefeller Avenue building was condemned in 1971 and the senior center was moved into the historic Longfellow School. The city government took over operations in 1973 and opened a new senior center on August 31, 1978; it was renamed for Carl Gipson, the city's first African American councilmember, in 2009. The city closed the senior center in March 2020 due to the COVID-19 pandemic and subsequent budget crisis; meal deliveries were offered during the closure. The senior center reopened in January 2022 under a public–private partnership with the Western Washington chapter of the Volunteers of America, which took over its operations.

=== Major parks ===
Forest Park, located southwest of Downtown Everett, is the largest park in the city system at 197 acres (80 ha). The park is situated along Pigeon Creek, with recreational facilities on a hilltop overlooking the ravine and several miles of hiking trails. It was acquired by the city in 1894 and named Forest Park in 1913. A public zoo was established at Forest Park in 1914 by parks director Oden Hall, who collected animals through trades and gifts from other zoos and traveling circuses. The zookeeper position was eliminated in 1958 and the zoo was demolished in 1962 after three bond issues to upgrade the facilities failed. Forest Park's main facilities were built during the 1930s by the Works Progress Administration, including the Floral Hall, playgrounds, terrace hillsides, and picnic shelters. The public swimming pool opened at Forest Park in 1976 and a permanent structure was built around it in 1984. Major renovations of the facilities in the park were completed in 1997 and 2020.

The largest park in North Everett is American Legion Memorial Park, a 140-acre (57 ha) open space on the peninsula's northwest bluff at the site of a former Snohomish village and smelter. The majority of the park is occupied by a golf course that was built by the American Legion and transferred to the city government alongside the rest of the park in 1935. The Evergreen Arboretum was built in 1963 at the northwest edge of the golf course, alongside a picnic shelter and the county's history museum. A scenic viewpoint on the park grounds with views of the Olympic Mountains was named Hibulb Lookout in 2014, commemorating the historic Snohomish village at the site.

Jetty Island is an artificial island in Port Gardner Bay that is home to sandy beaches and protected wildlife habitats. The two-mile (3.2 km) island was formed from dredging of the Snohomish River in the early 20th century and acquired by the Port of Everett in 1929. The city began operating a seasonal ferry between the island and a waterfront parking area in 1985; the ferry now runs from July to September, serving 50,000 visitors annually. Jetty Island is home to more than 115 identified bird species, salmon habitats, and mollusks.

== Education ==
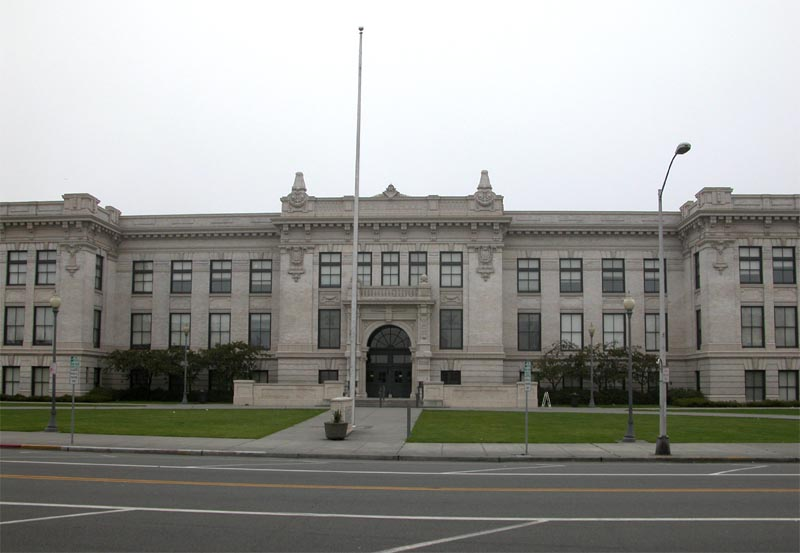
Everett High School, opened in 1910 and part of Everett Public Schools

The majority of the city lies within the school district for Everett Public Schools (officially the Everett School District), which has 26 schools, 2,000 staff members, and an enrollment of 20,000 students. Everett Public Schools is managed by a five-member elected board and covers 52 square miles (130 km^{2}), including most of Everett, the city of Mill Creek, and the unincorporated area of Silver Firs. The southern and western neighborhoods of Everett are served by the Mukilteo School District, which also has its own high school (Mariner) in the area.

Everett Public Schools has three high school campuses: Everett High School near downtown, Cascade High School near Casino Corner, and Henry M. Jackson High School in Mill Creek. The school district was recognized in 2016 for its high graduation rates of 90 percent for four-year students and 94.5 percent for five-year students. A fourth high school campus, planned to cost $220 million to build, was part of a bond measure in February 2018 that was rejected by voters, resulting in boundary changes for the existing schools. The school district also has five middle schools and eighteen elementary schools in Everett and Mill Creek. The city is also home to two alternative schools: Sequoia High School, operated by Everett Public Schools, and ACES High School, operated by the Mukilteo School District.

The Everett area is also home to several private school systems operated by religious organizations and independent educators, including those that cater to commuters from around the county. The largest private high school in the county is Archbishop Murphy High School, a Catholic school in southeastern Everett, with an enrollment of 500 students. Other major private religious schools include the Everett Christian School, Cedar Park Christian School, and Northshore Christian Academy.

=== Higher education ===
Everett Community College (EvCC) is a two-year public community college that has enrolled 19,000 students from around Snohomish County and 463 total faculty members. The college's main campus is in North Everett on the south side of Legion Memorial Golf Course. It was established in 1941 at a former downtown elementary school and moved to its North Everett location in 1958, where it has since expanded several times.

Civic and business leaders from the Everett area began lobbying the state legislature for a four-year college in the 1990s, proposing a branch of an existing state college to serve Snohomish, Island, and Skagit counties. A site in Bothell was instead chosen for a northern branch campus for the University of Washington (UW), but only 27 percent of its students were from Snohomish County. In 2007, the state legislature authorized planning funds for a UW branch campus in Snohomish County and a site near Everett Station was named as a finalist alongside candidates in Lake Stevens and Marysville. The branch campus project was shelved by the state legislature in 2008 amid a funding shortfall for the education system.

Washington State University Everett opened in 2017 as a branch campus of WSU and is adjacent to the EvCC campus in North Everett. The branch campus was conceived as a replacement for the UW proposal and included a WSU takeover of the University Center of North Puget Sound, an alternative degrees program at EvCC, in 2014. The EvCC campus also houses a branch of Western Washington University, which it established in 1986.

Everett is also home to several private and specialized colleges, including City University and Everest College near the Everett Mall. The city also has branch campuses for Embry–Riddle Aeronautical University near the Boeing assembly plant and Columbia College at Naval Station Everett. Everett's two major Lutheran churches operated a pair of short-lived private colleges in the early 20th century, Bethania College and Columbia College. Henry Cogswell College, a private institution, moved from Kirkland to Everett in 1996 and closed in 2006. In the 2010s, Bryman College and Trinity Lutheran College both closed their Everett campuses.

== Infrastructure ==
=== Transportation ===
Everett Station, the city's Amtrak and Sounder commuter rail station that also serves local and express buses

The city is bisected by Interstate 5 (I-5), a major north–south freeway that connects Everett to Seattle and Vancouver, British Columbia. The Everett–Seattle section of I-5 is rated as one of the most congested in the United States during commuting hours, with an average of 94 minutes to travel 24 miles (39 km) and 182,000 daily vehicles in South Everett. The city also has several major highways with intercity connections, including U.S. Route 2 to Wenatchee via Stevens Pass; State Route 99 from the Everett Mall to Seattle; State Route 526 to Mukilteo; State Route 527 from the Everett Mall to Mill Creek; and State Route 529 from the waterfront to Marysville.

Everett has several public transit and intercity transport services that intersect at Everett Station, a multimodal train and bus station that opened in 2002. The station is served by two Amtrak routes: Cascades, which connects Vancouver to Seattle and Portland, Oregon; and the Empire Builder, which travels from Seattle to Chicago. Everett is also the northern terminus of the Sounder commuter rail system, which is operated by Sound Transit and travels south to Seattle during peak hours with stops in Mukilteo and Edmonds. The station is served by intercity buses from Greyhound Lines, BoltBus, and Northwestern Trailways, which connect Everett to cities in the Pacific Northwest. The passenger trains operate on tracks owned by BNSF Railway, which operates freight service and maintains a major railyard in Northeast Everett.

The city-run Everett Transit system was established in 1969, replacing a private operator that had opened the first streetcar lines in the city in 1893. The countywide Community Transit system, based in Everett, connects to surrounding cities and operates a commuter bus network with hubs in the city. Its bus rapid transit system, Swift, has two lines that travel through the city: the Blue Line from Downtown Everett to Shoreline via State Route 99; and the Green Line, which connects the Boeing plant to Mill Creek and northern Bothell. Sound Transit also provides express bus service to Bellevue and Downtown Seattle during peak hours and Lynnwood City Center station at all hours. The agency plans to extend Link light rail service to Paine Field in 2037 and Downtown Everett by 2041 as part of the Sound Transit 3 plan passed by voters in 2016. A plan to build a high-speed railway in the Pacific Northwest is also under development with a station serving Everett among those proposed.

The city has 53 miles (85 km) of marked bicycle lanes, 13 miles (21 km) of designated bicycle trails, and 16 miles (26 km) of shared spaces for cyclists and other modes. During the COVID-19 pandemic in 2020, the city government temporarily closed three low-traffic streets to through traffic and converted them to "Healthy Streets" that would encourage cycling and walking. The Interurban Trail, a major inter-city bicycle and pedestrian trail, begins in Everett and continues south towards Seattle on the right-of-way of a former interurban railway that ran from 1910 to 1939. The city has hosted several scooter-sharing systems since 2019, when it introduced Lime scooters. The city permitted Bird to operate scooters in 2022; during the first five months of the program, over 26,000 trips were taken on scooters in the city that covered 48,500 miles (78,100 km).

Everett's airport, Paine Field, is operated by Snohomish County primarily for aerospace businesses and general aviation. The airport was opened in 1936 and was used as a military base and commercial airport until 1966, when Boeing selected it for the site of a major assembly plant. Commercial passenger service to Paine Field resumed on March 4, 2019, after the construction of a new terminal operated by a private company. The nearest major airports are Boeing Field in Seattle and Seattle-Tacoma International Airport in southern King County. A private passenger ferry from the Port of Everett provides access to Hat Island in Possession Sound.

=== Utilities ===
Electric power for Everett is provided by the Snohomish County Public Utility District (PUD), a consumer-owned public utility that serves all of Snohomish County and derives 90 percent of its electricity from hydropower. The privately run Puget Sound Energy provides natural gas service to the city's residents and businesses. The city government contracts with Rubatino Refuse Removal and Waste Management for curbside garbage, recycling, and yard waste collection and disposal. Everett's municipal wastewater and sewage system, which is combined with stormwater treatment, includes 145 miles (233 km) of pipes that primarily feed into the Everett Water Pollution Control Facility on Smith Island and empties in the Snohomish River delta.

The City of Everett maintains a tap water system that supplies 80 percent of Snohomish County through interlocal agreements with other municipalities and water districts. The system primarily sources its water from Spada Lake, an artificial reservoir on the Sultan River created by the Culmback Dam and located 25 miles (40 km) east of Everett in the Cascade Mountains. The water is treated at a filtration plant at Lake Chaplain, the system's secondary water source, which has a capacity of 134 million US gallons (510 million litres) per day and typically handles 50 million US gal (190 million L) per day. The Sultan River basin has been used as the main source of the city's water since 1917 and uses a 25-mile (40 km) network of pipes to reach Everett; the modern Spada Lake reservoir was formed in 1965 by the construction of the Culmback Dam, co-owned by Everett and the Snohomish County PUD. Several reservoirs in the city hold over 25 million US gal (95 million L) of water to supply Everett and surrounding cities.

The city is covered by several telecommunications companies that provide telephone, broadband internet, and other services. Ziply Fiber (formerly part of Frontier Communications) is the largest telecommunications provider in the city and inherited its legacy system from GTE Northwest and Verizon. The company is based in Everett at a building near the Boeing Factory that was completed in 1981 for GTE. Other major providers in the Everett area include Comcast Xfinity, CenturyLink, and Wave Broadband.

=== Healthcare ===
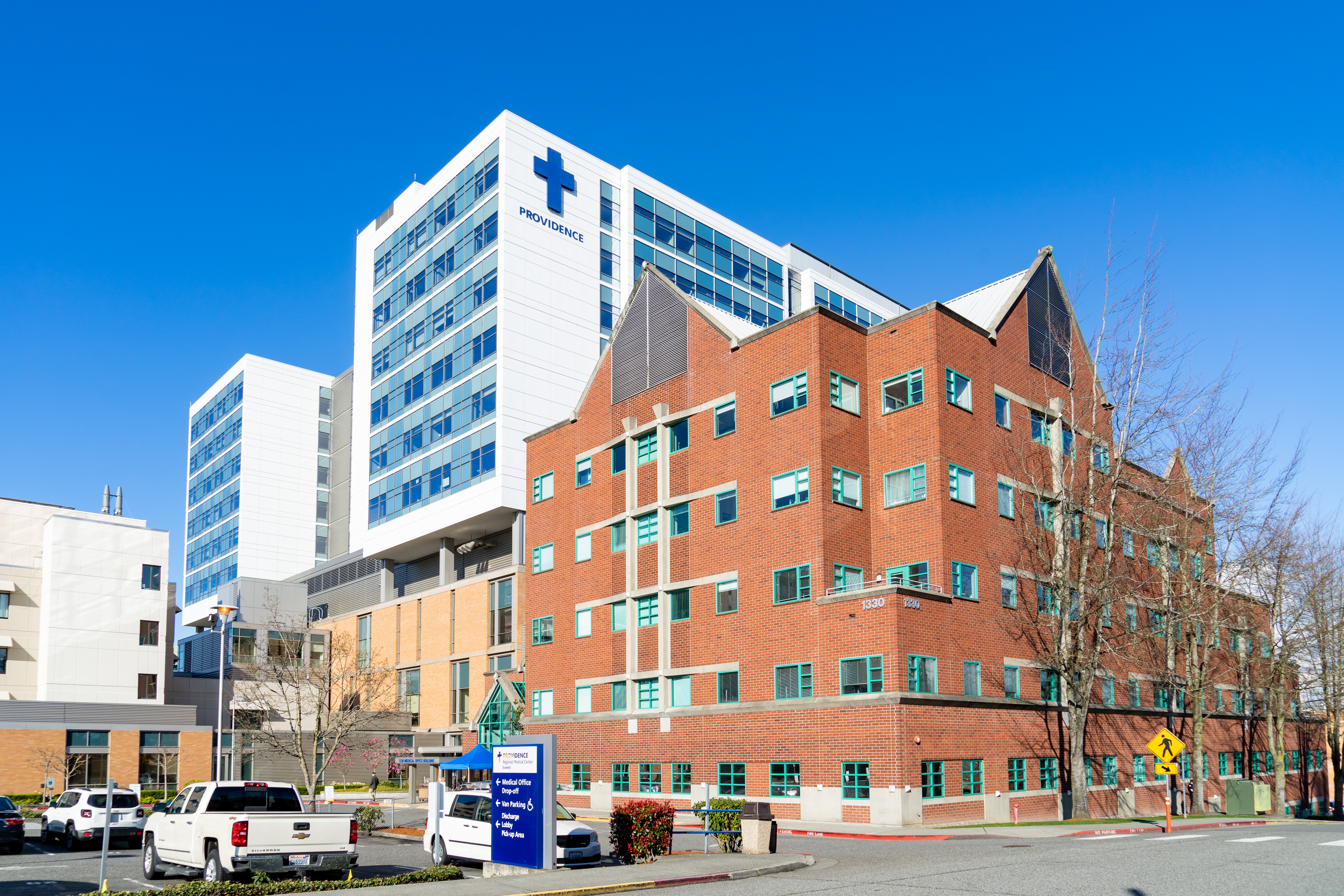
The original building and main tower at the Colby campus of the Providence Regional Medical Center

Everett is home to Providence Regional Medical Center Everett, a system of two general hospitals operated by Providence Health & Services. The hospital system was formed in 1994 by the merger of two existing hospitals in Everett: the Everett General Hospital, opened in January 1894 as the city's first hospital; and Providence Hospital, established in 1905 near Downtown Everett. The existing Providence Hospital was renamed the Providence Pacific Campus, while the former General Hospital became the Colby Campus, which was expanded in 2011 with a 12-story medical tower. The Providence campuses have a combined 3,300 employees and 571 beds, and are rated as a Level II trauma center.

The city also has several medical providers with clinics and specialized facilities operated by Providence and other organizations. Kaiser Permanente has a five-story medical tower in Downtown Everett with a walk-in clinic, specialty services, and an urgent care clinic. The building originally opened for Group Health in 1994 to consolidate its three clinics in Everett and is being expanded with a new building that began construction in 2020. The Everett Clinic is based in the city and operates medical facilities across Snohomish County, serving 320,000 patients. The system was founded in 1924 and acquired in 2016 by DaVita Inc.; it was then sold to UnitedHealth Group's Optum a year later. The non-profit Community Health Center of Snohomish County operates four medical clinics in Everett, providing services to primarily low-income and uninsured patients.

== Notable people ==
The city's residents are known as Everettites. Among them are U.S. Senator Henry M. Jackson, Washington governors Roland H. Hartley and Monrad Wallgren, and several other members of the U.S. Congress and Washington state legislature. The city has also produced several American football coaches under the tutelage of Everett High School coach Jim Ennis, including Jim Lambright, Mike Price, and Dennis Erickson.

== Sister cities ==
Everett has three official sister city relationships. The first was formed in 1962 with the Japanese city of Iwakuni in Yamaguchi Prefecture as part of a peace campaign organized by schoolchildren in both cities. Everett and Iwakuni have since hosted exchange student programs through, which have been run by Everett Community College since 1996. The eastern Russian city of Sovetskaya Gavan in Khabarovsk Krai became Everett's second sister city in 1991 as part of an exchange between the U.S. and Soviet Union cities. Sligo in County Sligo, Ireland, also became a sister city in 1991 based on the similar coastal and mountainous settings of the two cities.

== Bibliography ==
- Cameron, David A.; LeWarne, Charles P.; May, M. Allan; O'Donnell, Jack C.; O'Donnell, Lawrence E. (2005). Snohomish County: An Illustrated History. Index, Washington: Kelcema Books LLC. ISBN 978-0-9766700-0-1. OCLC 62728798.
- Dorpat, Paul; McCovy, Genevieve (1998). Building Washington: A History of Washington State Public Works. Seattle: Tartu Publications. ISBN 0-9614357-9-8. OCLC 40406154.
- May, Allan; Preboski, Dale (1989). The History of Everett Parks: A Century of Service and Vision. Norfolk, Virginia: The Donning Company. ISBN 0-89865-794-6. OCLC 20453314.
- O'Donnell, Lawrence E. (1993). Everett Past and Present: A Centennial History of Everett. Everett: K&H Printers. ISBN 978-0-89716-275-3. OCLC 436832753.
- Prosser, William Farrand (1903). A History of the Puget Sound Country. New York: Lewis Publishing Company. OCLC 14570355 – via The Internet Archive.
- Whitfield, William M. (1926). History of Snohomish County, Washington. Chicago: Pioneer Historical Publishing Company. OCLC 8437390 – via HathiTrust.
