= Everett University Center =

Education facility in Everett, Washington, US

The Everett University Center (EUC), formerly known as the University Center of North Puget Sound, is a "consortium of universities" located on the 3rd floor of the WSU Everett campus building in Everett, Washington. The EUC supports over 20 bachelor's and master's degrees from public partner universities and colleges to the residents of Snohomish, Island and Skagit counties. The center offers flexible scheduling and online or hybrid classes.

Each university manages the application, enrollment and degree programs while Washington State University administers the center and provides support services. Graduates receive their diplomas from the institution of their degree program. The diploma is the same as having completed a program on the main campus.

Degree programs at the EUC begin at the Junior and Senior level for Bachelor's degrees with the exception of Washington State University which admits freshman under select programs. The degree programs have established pathways that begin where the associate degree ended for seamless transition into major course work and degree attainment. The EUC currently consists of four schools:

- Eastern Washington University – Current
- University of Washington, Bothell – Current
- Washington State University – Current; managing partner
- Western Washington University – Current

== Programs and degrees ==
The EUC offers a variety of degrees that complement programs offered by Everett Community College as well as supporting the needs of local business and industry. The major disciplines include: Nursing, Business, Education, Environmental Science, Engineering, Social science and Human and Counseling Services.

== Students ==
The University Center's students range in age from 21 to 63. During the 2010–2011 academic year, the age breakdown was:

Age Range	Percent
19-25	29%
26-31	22%
32-41	23%
42-51	17%
52-63	9%

Nearly 45% of the University Center's students have earned credit/degree from Everett Community College prior to enrolling with one of the partner universities.

The University Center of North Puget Sound at a Glance 2010-2011 Student Headcount:

- Total Students – 500
- Female – 75%
- Caucasian – 75%

== Student Services ==
Students enrolled in partner programs at the University Center of North Puget Sound are able to access many of the student services at Everett CC (library, accommodation tables and chairs, technology, e-tutoring, etc.). Additionally, partner universities also provide a variety of services such as writing tutoring, disability services, social events, etc.

== Locations ==
On April 3, 2009, the University Center moved onto Everett Community College's main campus when Gray Wolf Hall opened. The 77,000-square-foot (7,200 m^{2}) Gray Wolf Hall is EvCC's first "green" building. It was designed to meet the U.S. Green Building Council's Leadership in Energy and Environmental Design (LEED) Silver Rating. Faculty and staff offices occupy the glass-sided north wing, and classrooms fill the brick-covered south wing. Some of the features include five video conference rooms, two state-of-the-art computer labs, artwork suspended over the second floor bridge, a student lounge and a rain garden in the courtyard.

The building is named after Gray Wolf Peak, the highpoint of Gray Wolf Ridge in eastern Olympic National Park at 7,218 feet (2,200 m) above sea level. The third floor of Gray Wolf has a view of the Olympic Mountains. EvCC historically names its buildings after peaks of the Cascade and Olympic mountains.

Gray Wolf Hall was designed by Seattle-based LMN Architects. Construction was by M.A. Mortenson Construction of Seattle.

The Evergreen State College's Bachelor of Arts in Liberal Arts is offered off-campus on the Tulalip Reservation.

== History ==
The University Center is a product of 1997 state legislation that formed the North Snohomish-Island-Skagit (NSIS) Consortium of higher education institutions to create a flexible and innovative means for expanding higher education opportunities for residents of the three counties. The NSIS Consortium was committed to providing opportunities for place-bound residents whose work and family commitments precluded travel to a distant university. In 2005, the legislature named consortium member Everett Community College as manager of the University Center. Washington State University has managed the University Center since 2014 as part of its Everett campus.

== Administration ==
Administrative oversight of the University Center is by Washington State University.
