= Jetty Island =

Island in Snohomish County, Washington, United States

Coordinates: 48°00′37″N 122°13′38″W

Jetty Island is a man-made island and park in the U.S. state of Washington, located 30 miles north of Seattle in the Puget Sound, just off the Everett, Washington waterfront. The island is two miles long and half a mile wide, approximately 1,800 acres. The island has no plumbing, electricity or structures, only a seasonal floating restroom off the island's shore. During the summer months, a small ferry becomes operational, allowing access to and from the island. During the summer months, Jetty is a popular destination for kiteboarding.

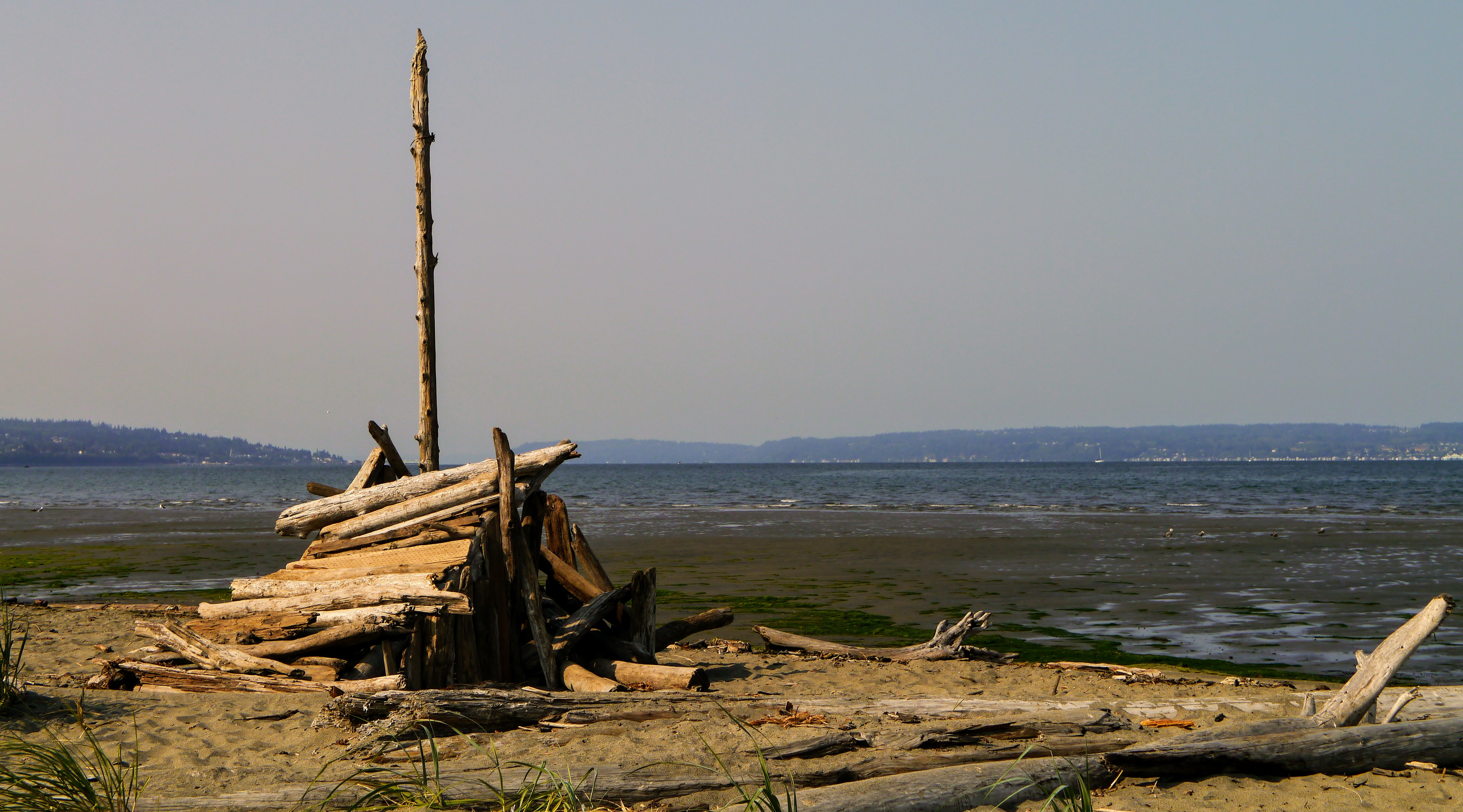
Westward Beach View

== History ==
Jetty Island began as a riprap jetty to provide a navigation channel and protected harbor in the late 19th century. The island is composed of sediment from the Snohomish River; material that was created by the maintenance dredging of the Snohomish River was used to build the island. The original dredged material was deposited over 100 years ago and has been added to over time. The Port of Everett gained ownership of Jetty Island in 1929 and, with the help of the U.S. Army Corps of Engineers, built a new marsh of dredged river materials in 1989.

== Ferry ==
During the summer months, the Port of Everett partners with the City of Everett Parks Department to provide a small ferry that allows access to and from the island. The ferry operates seven days a week and departs from the Port of Everett's boat launch. The ferry service, which began in 1985 with visitors riding for free, is now contracted to Argosy Cruises. It was cancelled for the 2020 season due to the COVID-19 pandemic; the ferry resumed the following season, albeit with the introduction of a fare at $3 for each rider over the age of two due to insufficient donations.

== Wildlife ==
Jetty Island is home to more than 45 bird species including osprey, shorebirds, hawks, eagles, cormorants and ducks. Visitors may see seals surfacing near the water's edge or lounging on the island's shore. On occasion, gray whales can be seen swimming past during spring migration.
