= Everett Water Pollution Control Facility =

Wastewater treatment plant in Washington, United States

Coordinates: 47.993°N 122.174°W

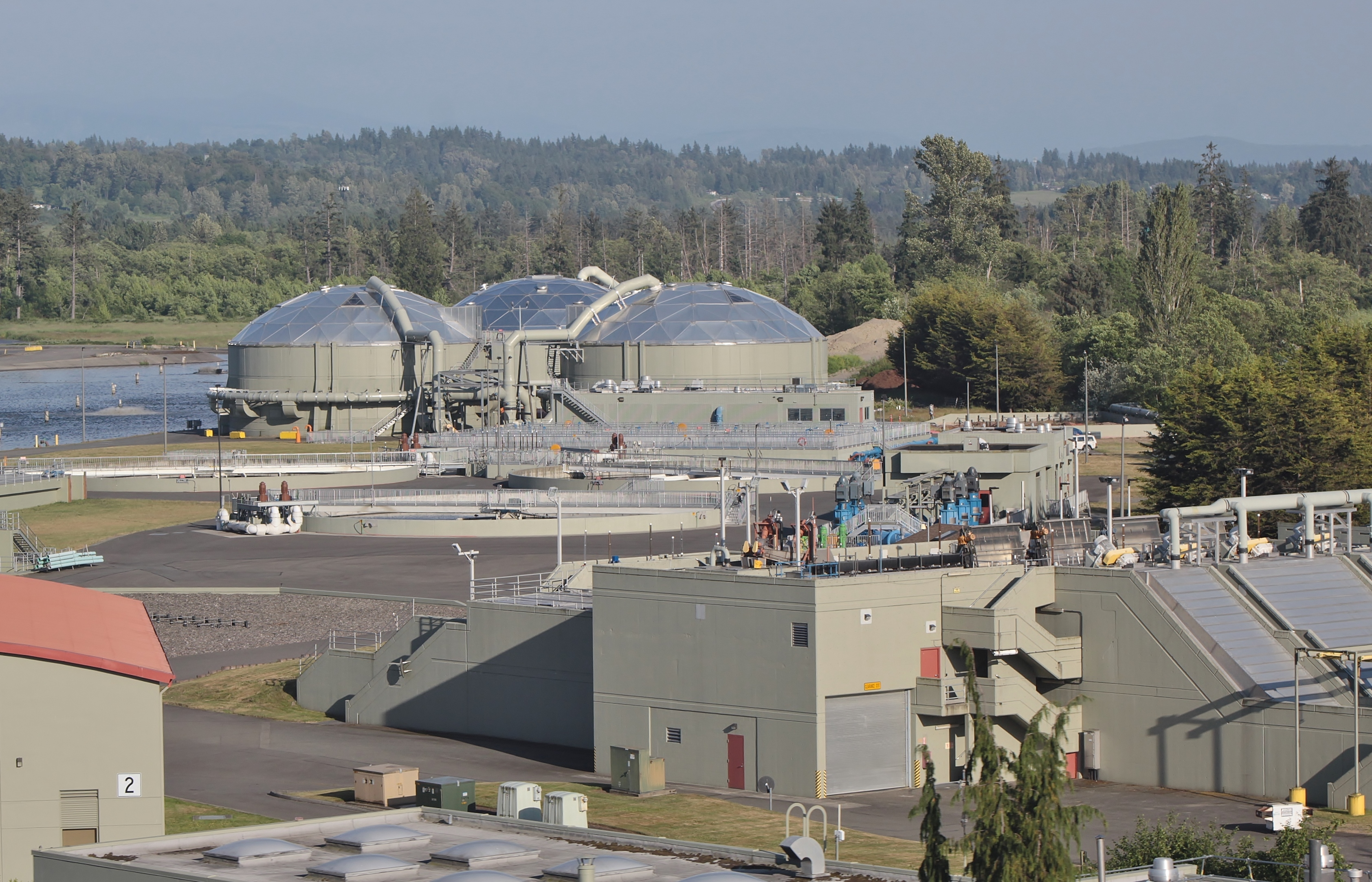
The main buildings of the facility as seen from Interstate 5

The Everett Water Pollution Control Facility is a wastewater treatment plant in Everett, Washington, United States. It serves the city of Everett and discharges treated water into the Snohomish River. The facility is located at the south end of Smith Island, adjacent to Interstate 5 and Spencer Island Regional Park, a noted birdwatching spot.

The lagoon system was built in the 1960s and covers 200 acres (81 ha). A mechanical treatment plant was opened in 1991 to accelerate water cleaning. Both systems were expanded in 2005–2007 to treat a combined 36 million US gallons (140,000 kl) of wastewater per day. The expansion also included measures to reduce foul odors from the plant, including lids on processing tanks and bio filters.
