= Snohomish County Courthouse =

- U.S. National Register of Historic Places
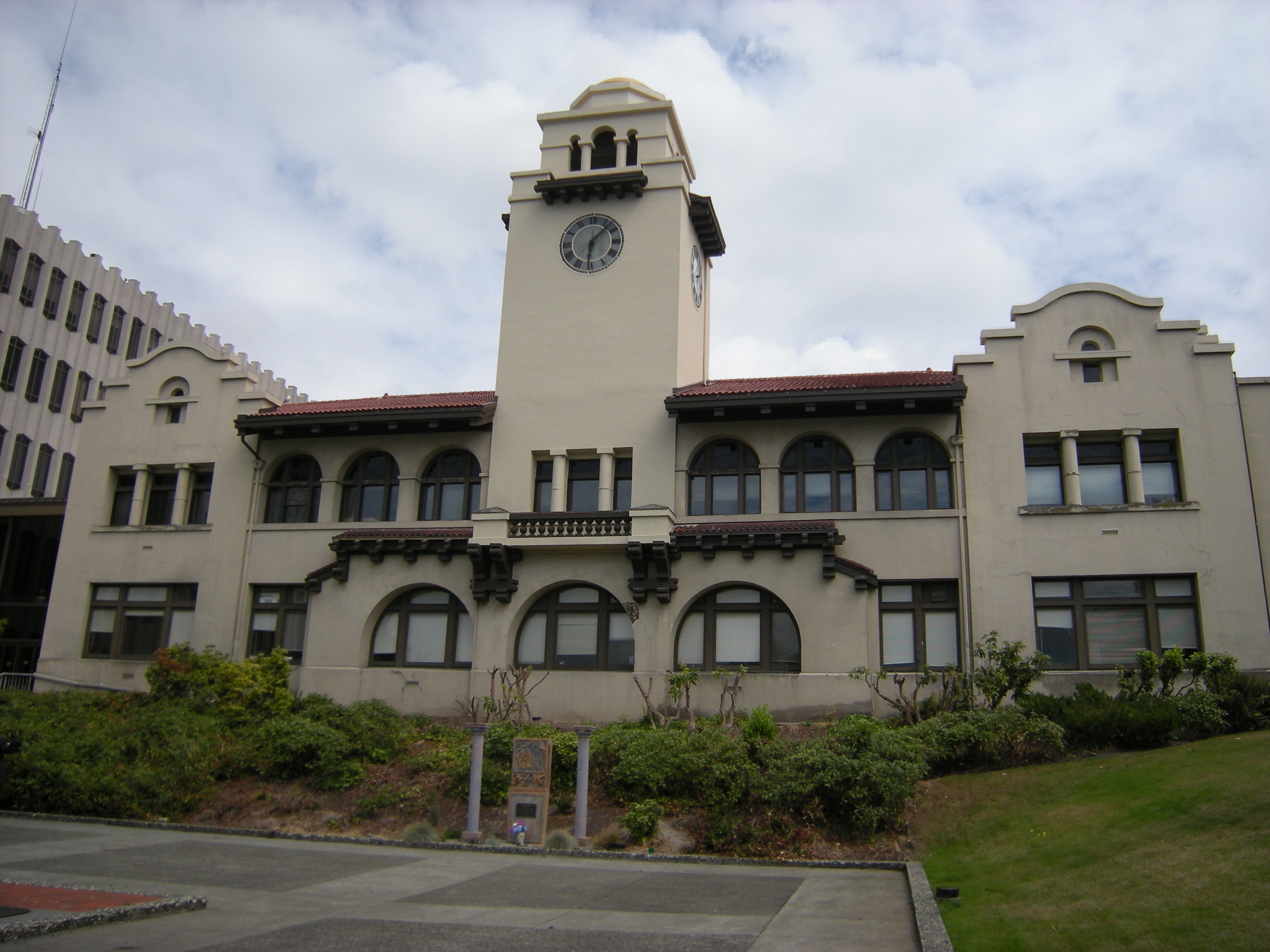

- Location within Washington (state) Location within the United States
- Interactive map showing the location of Snohomish County Courthouse
- Location: Wetmore Ave. between Wall St. and Pacific Ave., Everett, Washington
- Coordinates: 47°58′39″N 122°12′19″W
- Area: less than one acre
- Built: 1910
- Architect: Siebrand & Heide
- NRHP reference No.: 75001870
- Added to NRHP: December 6, 1975

The Snohomish County Courthouse is a building located in Everett, Washington listed on the National Register of Historic Places. It is built in Spanish Mission style on the site of a building destroyed in a fire in 1909. The previous court building was completed in 1897 and the same architect (August F Heide) was available to design the rebuilding.

Proposals for extensions and remodeling from the 1940s onwards were generally not implemented, although two wings were added in 1953. A five-story wing was added in 1967, built on the site of the 1908 two-story annex to the north; a similar building was built on the block east of the court complex in 1973. In the early 2000s, grant funding was used to restore the fabric of the original 1911 building to its original appearance, including restoring damaged features. From 2018 to 2021, the 1967 wing underwent a $74.8 million renovation that included the construction of a five-story expansion wing and an additional courtroom.

== See also ==
- National Register of Historic Places listings in Snohomish County, Washington
