= Dohkwibuhch =

Snohomish Creator deity

- Creator deity
- Region: Puget Sound region
- Ethnic group: Snohomish people

Dohkwibuhch (Lushootseed: dukʷibəɬ) is the creator deity of the Snohomish people of the Puget Sound, Washington.

According to the myth, Dohkwibuhch began the creation of the world in the east, giving a new language to each group that he created. When he reached the Puget Sound, he liked the area so much that he decided to stop there. He then took the remaining languages and spread them around, explaining why the tribes of the area have so many different languages. Since they were unable to talk to each other, the people were displeased with Dohkwibuhch.

Dohkwibuhch had also made a mistake when making the sky. It was too low, and tall people would strike their heads on it. People could also enter the sky world by climbing trees. A group of wise men gathered to devise a plan to lift the sky. They decided that it could be done if everyone in the world lifted at the same time, which the wise men called "Yah-hoh", which meant "lift together" in all of their languages. However, when the time came, a group of three hunters were unaware of the plan. They had followed a herd of four elk into the sky world. When the sky was lifted, they and their quarry became trapped in the sky forever, with the hunters becoming the handle of the Big Dipper and the elk becoming its bowl.
