= Interstate 5 in Washington =

Interstate highway in Washington

Interstate 5
- Purple Heart Trail
- A map of Western Washington with I-5 highlighted in red

Route information
- Maintained by WSDOT
- Length: 276.62 mi (445.18 km)
- Existed: August 14, 1957–present
- History: Completed in 1969
- Tourist routes: Cascade Loop Scenic Byway; Lewis and Clark Trail Scenic Byway; Skagit Valley Agricultural Scenic Corridor
- NHS: Entire route

Major junctions
- South end: I-5 at the Oregon state line in Vancouver
- I-205 in Salmon Creek; US 12 near Centralia; US 101 in Tumwater; SR 16 in Tacoma; I-405 / SR 518 in Tukwila; I-90 in Seattle; SR 520 in Seattle; I-405 / SR 525 in Lynnwood; US 2 in Everett; SR 20 in Burlington
- North end: Highway 99 at the Canadian border in Blaine

Location
- Country: United States
- State: Washington
- Counties: Clark, Cowlitz, Lewis, Thurston, Pierce, King, Snohomish, Skagit, Whatcom

Highway system
- Interstate Highway System; Main; Auxiliary; Suffixed; Business; Future; State highways in Washington; Interstate; US; State; Scenic; Pre-1964; 1964 renumbering; Former
← SR 4	→ SR 6

Interstate 5 (I-5) is an Interstate Highway on the West Coast of the United States that serves as the region's primary north–south route. It spans 277 miles (446 km) across the state of Washington, from the Oregon state border at Vancouver, through the Puget Sound region, to the Canadian border at Blaine. Within the Seattle metropolitan area, the freeway connects the cities of Tacoma, Seattle, and Everett.

I-5 is the only interstate to traverse the whole state from north to south and is Washington's busiest highway, with an average of 274,000 vehicles traveling on it through Downtown Seattle on a typical day. The segment in Downtown Seattle is also among the widest freeways in the United States, at 13 lanes, and includes a set of express lanes that reverse direction depending on time of the day. Most of the freeway is four lanes in rural areas and six to eight lanes in suburban areas, including a set of high-occupancy vehicle lanes in the latter. I-5 also has three related auxiliary Interstates in the state, I-205, I-405, and I-705, as well as several designated business routes and state routes.

The freeway follows several historic railroads and wagon trails developed during American settlement of western Washington in the mid-to-late 19th century. The state legislature incorporated local roads into the Pacific Highway in 1913, connecting the state's southern and northern borders between Vancouver and Blaine. The Pacific Highway was built and paved over the next decade, and became the northernmost segment of the national U.S. Route 99 (US 99) in 1926.

The federal government endorsed the creation of a national expressway system in the 1940s, including several bypasses on US 99 that were built by the state in the early 1950s. The state's planned toll superhighway in the Seattle area was shelved in favor of a federally-funded freeway under the new Interstate Highway System, under which I-5 was created in 1957. Construction of I-5 was completed in 1969, and several segments of the highway have been widened or improved in the decades since.

== Route description ==
Interstate 5 is the only Interstate to traverse Washington from north to south, serving as the primary highway for the western portion of the state. It is listed as part of the National Highway System and the state's Highways of Statewide Significance program, recognizing its connection to major communities. I-5 has three auxiliary Interstate Highways within Washington: I-205, an easterly bypass of Portland, Oregon, and Vancouver; I-405, bypassing Seattle via the Eastside; and I-705, a short spur into Tacoma. It was designated as the Purple Heart Trail in 2013 by the Washington State Transportation Commission to honor wounded military veterans.

The freeway runs through the most densely populated region of Washington state, with 4.6 million people living in the nine counties on the corridor, approximately 70 percent of the state's population. Several of the largest cities along the I-5 corridor are also connected by the parallel Cascades, a regional train service between Eugene, Oregon, and Vancouver, British Columbia, operated by Amtrak and funded by the state governments of Oregon and Washington.

I-5 is maintained by the Washington State Department of Transportation (WSDOT), who conduct an annual survey of traffic volume that is expressed in terms of annual average daily traffic (AADT), a measure of traffic volume for any average day of the year. The stretch of I-5 through Downtown Seattle is the busiest highway in Washington state, with a daily average of over 274,000 vehicles in the mainline and express lanes. The least-traveled segment of I-5 is located at SR 548 in Blaine, with a daily average of 6,600 vehicles. I-5 through the Seattle metropolitan area is among the worst congested highways in the United States, with 78 percent of peak direction miles classified as "routinely congested" for seven to eight hours a day and an average annual delay of 55 hours for Seattle–Everett commutes. The freeway has a maximum speed limit of 70 miles per hour (110 km/h) in rural areas and 60 mph (97 km/h) in urban and suburban areas, which includes a 100-mile (160 km) section between Tumwater and Marysville.

=== Southwestern Washington ===
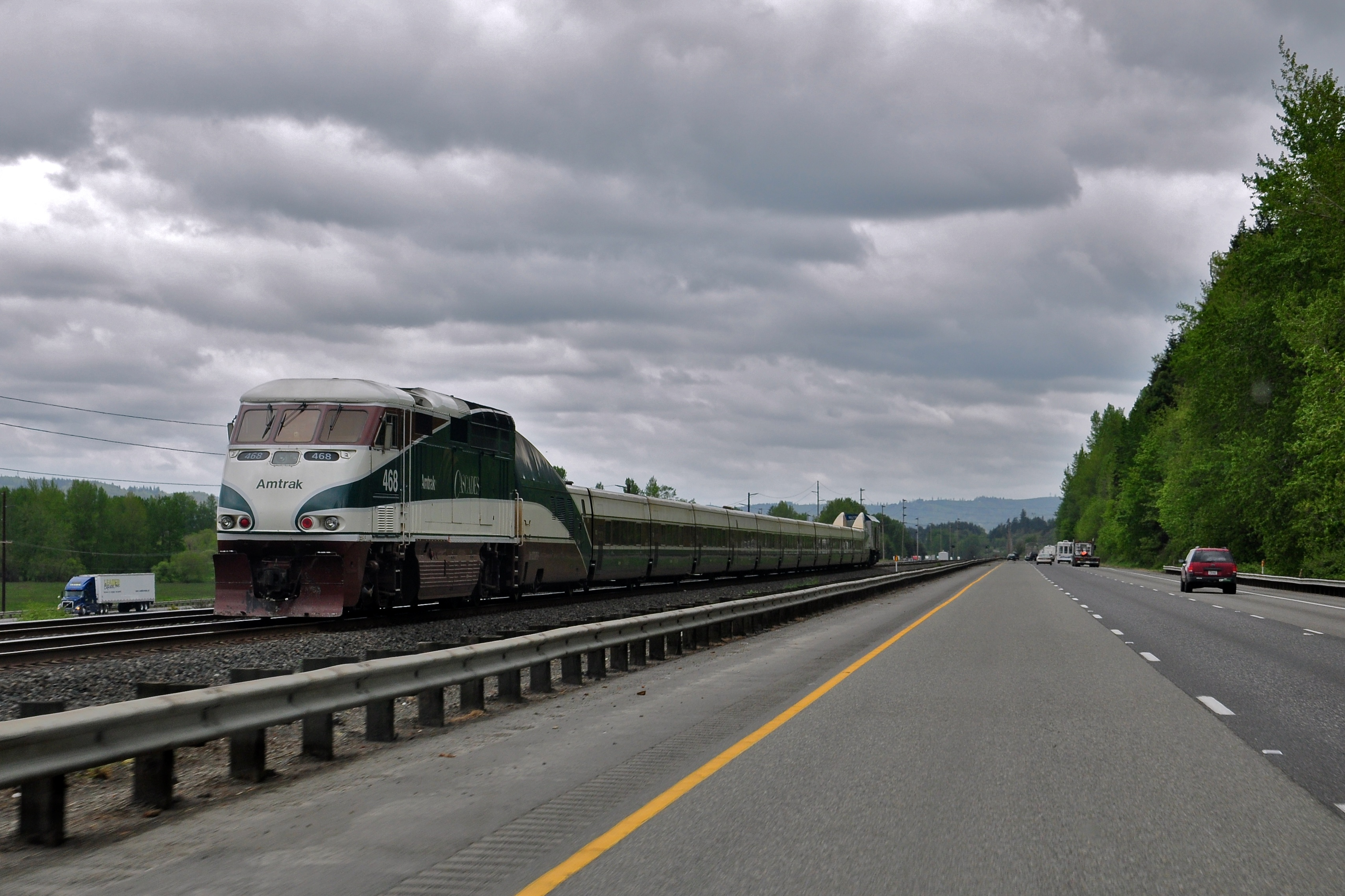
An Amtrak Cascades train running in the median of I-5 near Kalama. The route of the Cascades generally runs parallel to I-5 within Washington state.

I-5 enters Washington on the Interstate Bridge, a pair of vertical-lift bridges that span the Columbia River between Portland, Oregon, and Vancouver, Washington. The bridge is the only point on I-5 where vehicles have to stop for cross traffic, because of the lifts. On the north bank of the river, the freeway passes under a railroad viaduct carrying Amtrak's Empire Builder and intersects SR 14. The interchange with SR 14, located west of Pearson Field and the Fort Vancouver National Historic Site, also includes ramps serving downtown Vancouver. I-5 continues north through suburban Vancouver and into Hazel Dell, passing the Clark College campus and intersecting SR 501 at Fourth Plain Boulevard and SR 500 at Burnt Bridge Creek. I-5 intersects I-205, the eastern freeway bypass of the Portland metropolitan area, in Salmon Creek near the Vancouver campus of Washington State University.

From Salmon Creek, I-5 continues northwesterly and intersects SR 502 at the Gee Creek rest area west of Battle Ground. Its next interchange, in eastern Ridgefield, forms the eastern terminus of SR 501. The freeway passes the Ilani Casino Resort on the Cowlitz reservation and crosses the Lewis River into Woodland, where it intersects SR 503. Northwest of Woodland, the median of I-5 is used by freight trains and Amtrak's Cascades and Coast Starlight passenger trains, which follow the freeway for its entire length. I-5 continues along the east bank of the Columbia River, passing through Kalama on the way towards Longview and Kelso. At the south end of Kelso, near the confluence of the Columbia and Cowlitz rivers, the freeway intersects SR 432, which connects to Longview and the Lewis and Clark Bridge via SR 433. I-5 continues north along the Coweeman River to the Three Rivers Mall, located east of downtown Kelso, where SR 4 terminates. Between Vancouver and Kelso, the highway is part of the Lewis and Clark Trail, a state scenic highway that continues west along SR 4 towards the Pacific Ocean.

The freeway continues north, following the Cowlitz River to Castle Rock, where it meets SR 411 and a short business route that loops back to an interchange with SR 504, the main highway to Mount St. Helens. North of Castle Rock, the Cowlitz River turns away from I-5 as the latter enters Lewis County, intersecting SR 506 west of Toledo and SR 505 east of Winlock. Between the two interchanges is the Gospodor Monument Park, a roadside attraction with four sculptures of up to 100 feet (30 m) in height commemorating religious and indigenous figures. After their installation in 2002, the sculptures caused backups on the freeway due to rubbernecking by passing drivers who slowed down near them. Near Napavine, I-5 becomes concurrent with US 12, which continues east across White Pass to Yakima.

The two highways intersect SR 508 and cross over the Newaukum River near the Uncle Sam billboard, formerly a politically conservative message board and roadside attraction, now owned by the Confederated Tribes of the Chehalis Reservation. I-5 and US 12 turn northwest to follow the river and pass along the western edge of Chehalis, where they intersect SR 6. After passing the Chehalis-Centralia Airport, the freeway follows the Chehalis River to the western side of Centralia. I-5 and US 12 then intersect SR 507 and gain a set of collector–distributor lanes as the freeway crosses the Skookumchuck River and a set of railroad tracks on the northwest side of the city. US 12 leaves the concurrency at Grand Mound, heading west towards Aberdeen while I-5 continues north into Thurston County.

=== South Sound region ===
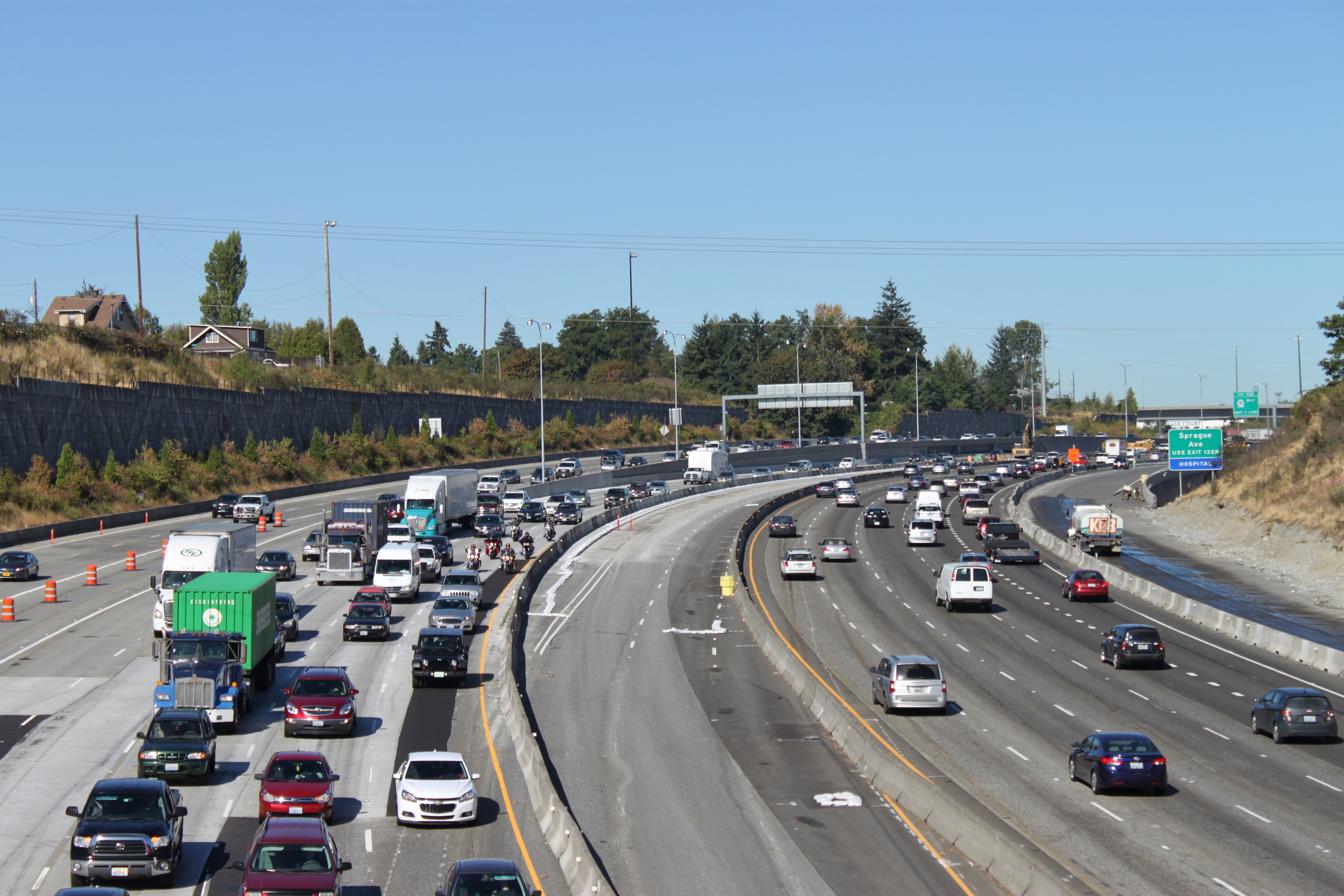
A section of I-5 near downtown Tacoma, pictured in 2015 during an expansion project

North of Grand Mound, I-5 passes two interchanges with SR 121, which forms a loop between two of the exits to serve Millersylvania State Park. The freeway travels through the suburb of Tumwater, passing the Olympia Regional Airport and several state office parks before reaching the terminus of US 101, a major highway that encircles the Olympic Peninsula, on the south side of Capitol Lake. After the interchange, I-5 enters Olympia and turns eastward after passing the Washington State Capitol campus and downtown Olympia. The freeway passes through Lacey and the Hawks Prairie industrial area, where it intersects SR 510, a highway serving the Nisqually Indian Community and Yelm. I-5 continues northeast through the Billy Frank Jr. Nisqually National Wildlife Refuge towards DuPont on the east side of the Nisqually River in Pierce County.

Immediately east of DuPont, I-5 travels through Joint Base Lewis–McChord, a major military installation that encompasses land on both sides of the freeway and its parallel railroad. Near American Lake, an interchange with Thorne Lane marks the proposed western terminus of SR 704, a new highway that would travel between the boundaries of Fort Lewis and McChord Air Force Base (the two components of Joint Base Lewis–McChord) to Spanaway. Continuing past the bases, I-5 passes through Lakewood and intersects SR 512, a freeway connecting east to Puyallup, before it reaches Tacoma.

In Tacoma, the freeway passes the Tacoma Mall, turns east, and splits into collector–distributor lanes that run through central Tacoma and serve two interchanges: the terminus of SR 16, which continues northwest over the Tacoma Narrows Bridge to the Kitsap Peninsula; and I-705 and SR 7, which serve downtown Tacoma, the Tacoma Dome, Tacoma Dome Station, and the Pacific Avenue corridor. East of the Tacoma Dome area, I-5 intersects SR 167 and crosses over the Puyallup River and a railroad carrying Sounder commuter trains. The freeway reaches Fife on the Puyallup Indian Reservation and intersects SR 99, a section of former US 99, at 54th Avenue East near the Emerald Queen Casino. After crossing Hylebos Creek, I-5 turns north and ascends from the Puyallup River Valley, entering King County and the city of Federal Way while parallel to SR 99.

After passing under SR 161 at Kitts Corner near the Wild Waves Theme Park, I-5 intersects SR 18, a freeway that connects to Auburn and Maple Valley. I-5 continues north past the former corporate headquarters of Weyerhauser to central Federal Way, where the freeway's high-occupancy vehicle lanes (HOV lanes) have a direct off-ramp to the Federal Way Transit Center and The Commons at Federal Way shopping mall. The freeway travels north into western Kent, intersecting SR 516 near Highline College. North of Angle Lake, I-5 tracks eastward between the cities of SeaTac and Tukwila, passing east of Seattle–Tacoma International Airport. At the Westfield Southcenter shopping mall in Tukwila, I-5 intersects SR 518, the primary means of access to the airport and Burien, and I-405, the eastern freeway bypass of Seattle that travels through Renton and the Eastside. The interchange includes several left-hand ramps, necessitating the separation of the thru HOV lanes from the mainline. For a short distance, the light rail tracks of the Link 1 Line, which followed SR 518 from Tukwila International Boulevard station, join I-5 and run on its west side until the next interchange at SR 599, a short freeway that connects to SR 99. From the SR 599 interchange, I-5 makes a gradual turn to the northwest while crossing over the Duwamish River and a mainline railroad, following the latter into the city of Seattle after an interchange with SR 900.

=== Seattle and Shoreline ===
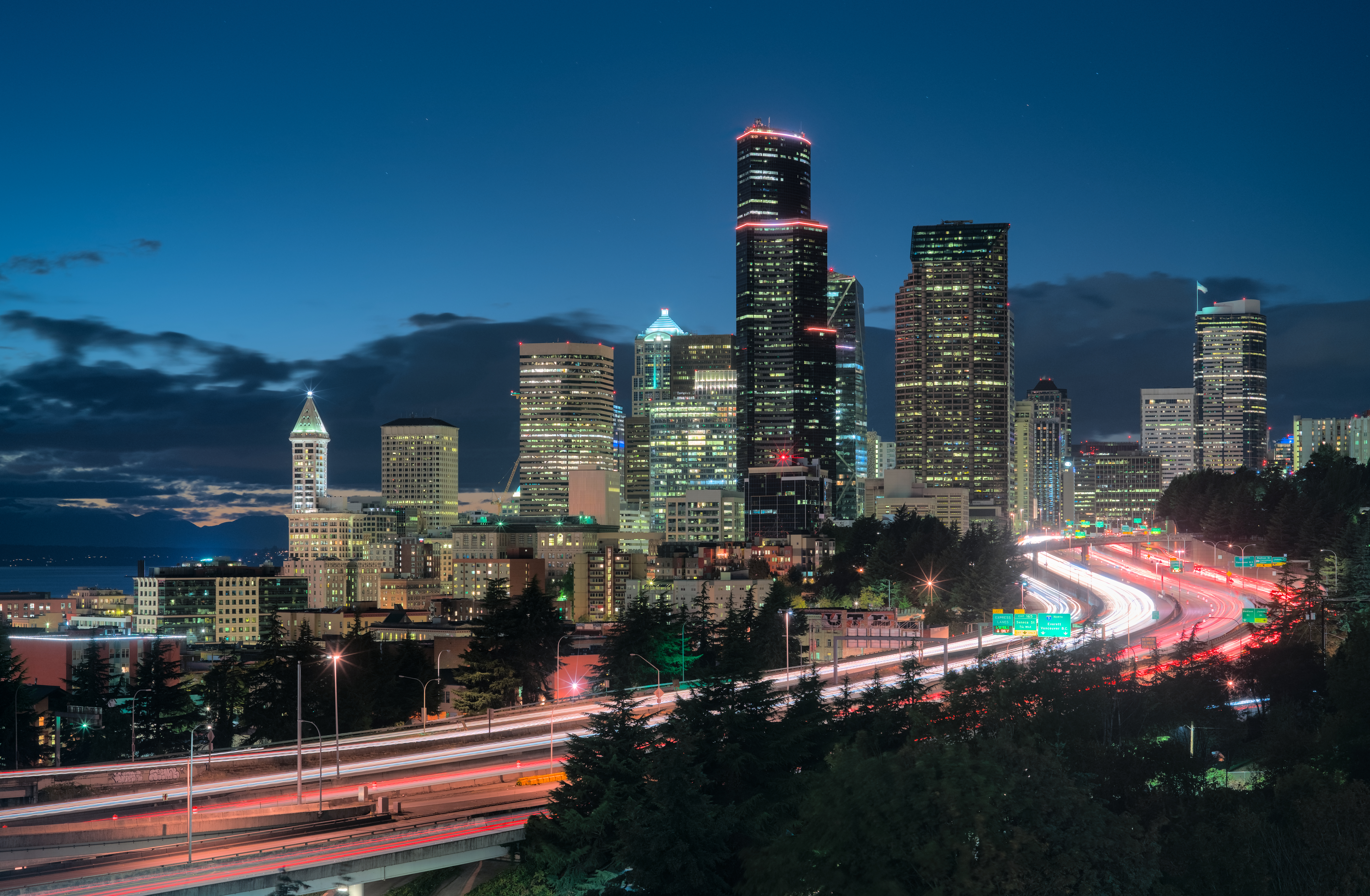
I-5 and the Downtown Seattle skyline, as seen from Dr. Jose Rizal Park on Beacon Hill

After entering Seattle, I-5 passes under the Link 1 Line tracks at Boeing Access Road and runs northwesterly between Boeing Field and Georgetown to the west along the railroad and Beacon Hill to the east. Mid-way along Beacon Hill near Jefferson Park, the freeway turns due north and intersects the east end of the Spokane Street Viaduct, part of the West Seattle Bridge, which has additional ramps to the SoDo area and the VA Puget Sound Medical Center. I-5 continues north between SoDo and northern Beacon Hill, crossing over the western portal of the Beacon Hill light rail tunnel near 1 Line's railyard and operating base. At the north end of SoDo and Beacon Hill, I-5 intersects I-90, the state's major east–west freeway, forming a large interchange with ramps to T-Mobile Park and Lumen Field, two of the city's professional sports stadiums.

North of the interchange, I-5 travels on an elevated viaduct over the International District and splits into collector–distributor lanes that serve exits to Downtown Seattle. The thirteen-lane freeway, among the widest in the United States, runs in the full block between 6th and 7th avenues between downtown to the west and First Hill to the east, home to Harborview Medical Center and Yesler Terrace. It passes to the east of Seattle's tallest building, the Columbia Center, and the city's Central Library before adding a set of reversible express lanes in the median near Madison Street. I-5 turns northeasterly and passes under two structures built atop sections of the highway: Freeway Park, a landscaped city park between Seneca and Union streets; and the Seattle Convention Center between Union and Pike streets.

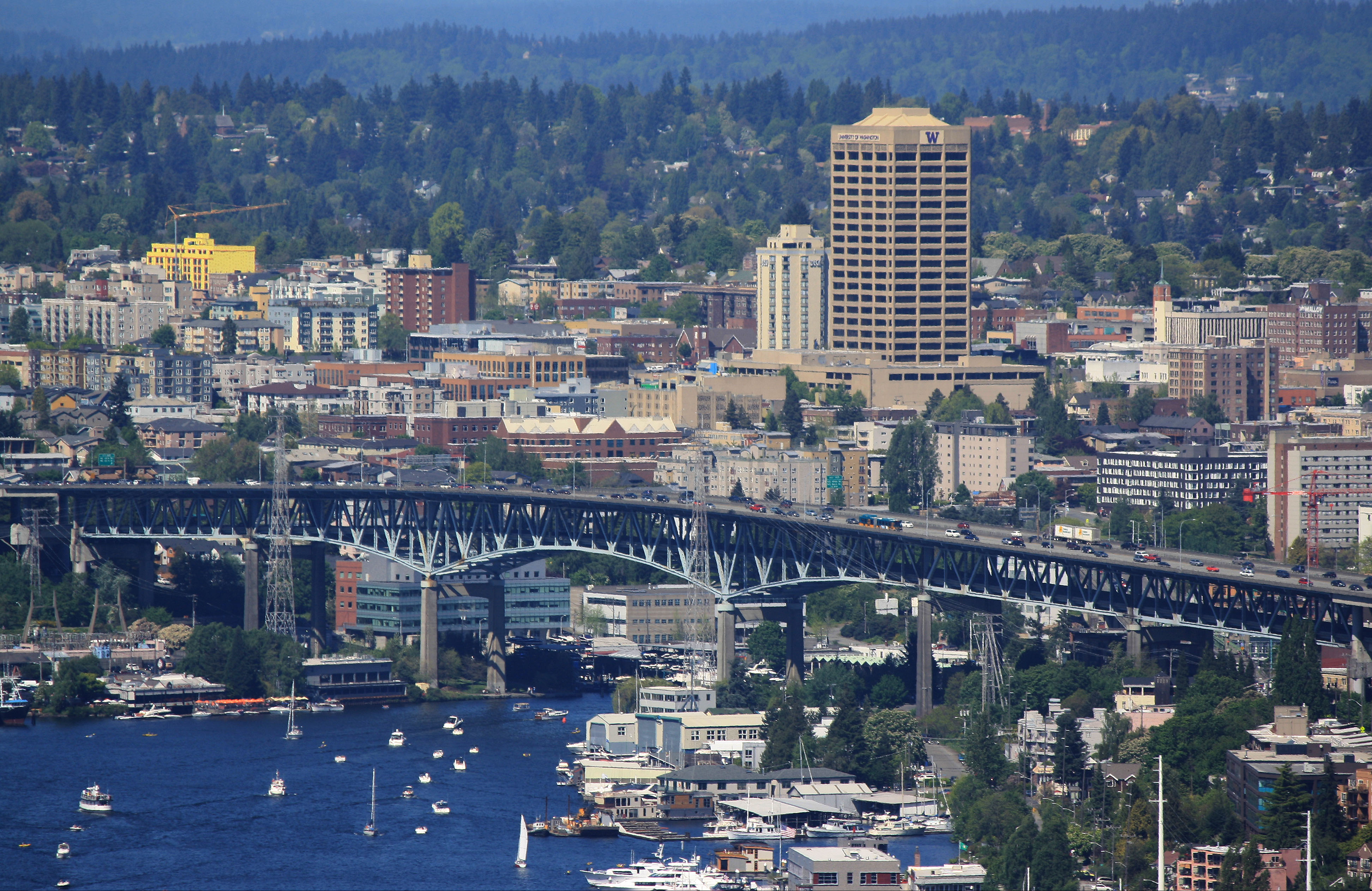
The Ship Canal Bridge, which carries I-5 into the University District in Seattle

I-5 continues north out of downtown Seattle under a 20-to-30-foot (6.1 to 9.1 m) retaining wall along Melrose Avenue at the edge of Capitol Hill. To the west is the South Lake Union and Cascade neighborhoods, accessed via ramps to Stewart Street and Mercer Street. The freeway travels along the north end of Capitol Hill through the Eastlake neighborhood on the east side of Lake Union, passing over the I-5 Colonnade mountain bike park. At Roanoke Park, I-5 intersects the western terminus of SR 520, a major freeway that crosses Lake Washington on the Evergreen Point Floating Bridge to Bellevue and Redmond. The heavily trafficked Mercer Street and SR 520 exits use ramps that are on opposite sides of the freeway, causing vehicles to weave across several lanes that contributes to traffic congestion.

I-5 continues onto the Ship Canal Bridge towards the University District, crossing 160 feet (49 m) over a section of the Lake Washington Ship Canal and Eastlake Avenue parallel to the University Bridge. The bridge also includes a lower deck for the express lanes, with a ramp connecting to Northeast 42nd Street in the University District.

I-5 runs north along 5th Avenue through the University District, a few blocks west of the University of Washington campus, and intersects Northeast 45th and 50th streets using a weaved pair of diamond interchanges. In the Roosevelt–Green Lake area, I-5 intersects Ravenna Boulevard and SR 522, a major highway that travels along the north side of Lake Washington. Further north, the freeway reaches Northgate and the express lanes merge back with the mainline, forming a set of HOV lanes. I-5 passes to the west of Northgate Mall and the Northgate light rail station along 1st Avenue before moving back east to 5th Avenue near Haller Lake. At Jackson Park, freeway intersects SR 523, which runs on 145th Street and forms the northern city limit of Seattle. The interchange includes a set of flyer stops that are connected to SR 523 by a northbound loop ramp and southbound slip ramp. I-5 continues north through Shoreline, passing the King County Metro north bus base and several suburban neighborhoods before reaching Snohomish County.

=== Snohomish County ===
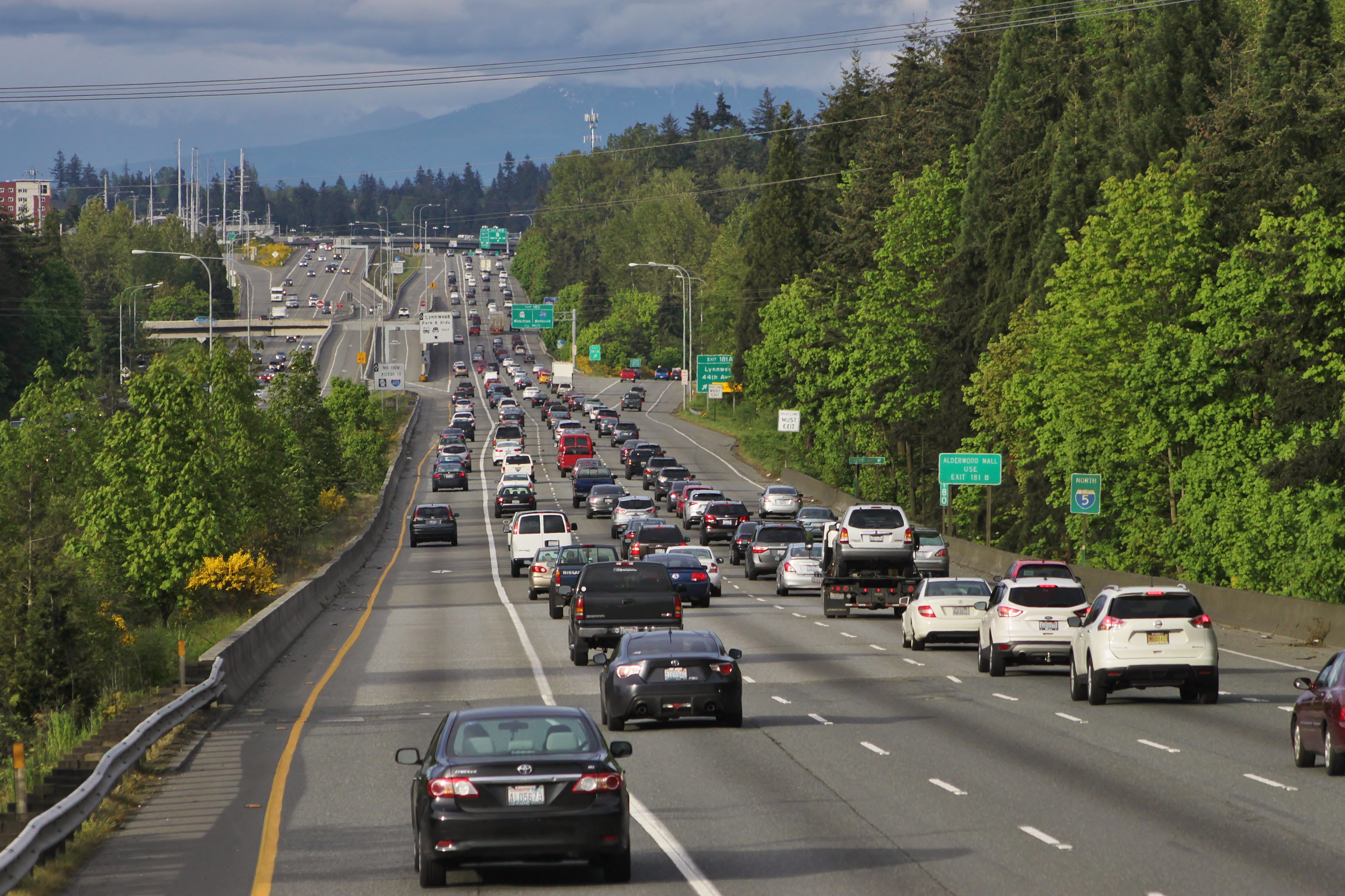
View of northbound I-5 in Lynnwood

At the county line near Lake Ballinger, I-5 intersects SR 104, a highway that connects to Lake Forest Park, Edmonds, and the Kitsap Peninsula via the Edmonds–Kingston ferry. The freeway continues through western Mountlake Terrace, passing the Mountlake Terrace Transit Center and its median bus station near 236th Street Southwest. Upon entering Lynnwood, I-5 turns northeast and follows the Interurban Trail, passing the Lynnwood Transit Center, which is connected to the HOV lanes via a set of direct ramps. The freeway then intersects SR 524 (196th Street Southwest) and its spur route on 44th Avenue West before heading towards Alderwood Mall. To the east of the mall, I-5 intersects I-405 and SR 525.

I-5 crosses into northern Lynnwood and intersects 164th Street Southwest near Martha Lake and Mill Creek, where a partial HOV ramp connects to the Ash Way Park and Ride. The freeway continues north into Everett and intersects SR 96 southeast of Paine Field. It then passes Silver Lake and the South Everett park and ride (located in the freeway's median) at 112th Street Southeast near the Everett Mall and a southbound-only rest area. Northeast of the mall, I-5 comes to a major interchange with several highways: SR 99, which travels southwest as Everett Mall Way; SR 526, which travels west to the Boeing Everett Factory and Mukilteo; SR 527, which travels south through Mill Creek; and Broadway, which continues north into downtown Everett. From the mall interchange, I-5 descends towards the Lowell area on the east side of a hill with several suburban neighborhoods. Near the Everett Memorial Stadium and Lowell Park, the freeway intersects 41st Street in a single-point urban interchange, with additional ramps from the HOV and mainline lanes towards downtown Everett on Broadway.

I-5 then curves northeasterly around downtown Everett, following the general course of the Snohomish River, and intersects the southern terminus of SR 529 at a half-diamond interchange with Pacific Avenue and Maple Street near the Everett train station and transit center. One block north of the interchange, the freeway intersects US 2, a major highway that travels across Stevens Pass to eastern Washington. To the north of the US 2 ramps is a second half-diamond interchange with SR 529 Spur on Everett Avenue, at which point the HOV lanes terminate and leave the freeway at six total lanes. I-5 continues north through a narrow trench in the Riverside neighborhood and passes Summit Park, a city park built using leftover land and excavated dirt from the freeway's construction.

The freeway continues over the Snohomish River and descends into the river's estuary, which has several sloughs that I-5 crosses. It also passes the Everett Water Pollution Control Facility and several wastewater treatment ponds, which produces strong odors that are noted by motorists. On the north side of Steamboat Slough, I-5 turns northwesterly and intersects SR 529 before crossing over the BNSF Railway and Ebey Slough into Marysville. Within Marysville, the freeway runs due north along the boundary between the city and the Tulalip Indian Reservation and intersects several arterial streets: SR 528 west of downtown Marysville, 88th Street near Quil Ceda Village, and 116th Street near the Tulalip Resort Casino and Seattle Premium Outlets shopping mall.

North of the city and reservation, I-5 crosses over the railroad and enters Arlington's Smokey Point neighborhood, where it intersects SR 531 just west of Arlington Municipal Airport. A pair of rest areas are situated north of the interchange and are the busiest in the state, serving 2.1 million visitors per year, and is home to a 22-foot-wide (6.7 m) Western red cedar stump that was once hollowed out to allow vehicles to drive through it. As I-5 moves north of Arlington, the area around the freeway transforms from suburban to rural, with rolling hills and forested areas. In the Island Crossing neighborhood west of downtown, there is an interchange with SR 530. North of Island Crossing, I-5 crosses the Stillaguamish River and passes the Stillaguamish Indian Reservation and the Angel of the Winds Casino Resort. The freeway continues northwest through rural Snohomish County and intersects SR 532 east of Stanwood before crossing into Skagit County.

=== Skagit and Whatcom counties ===
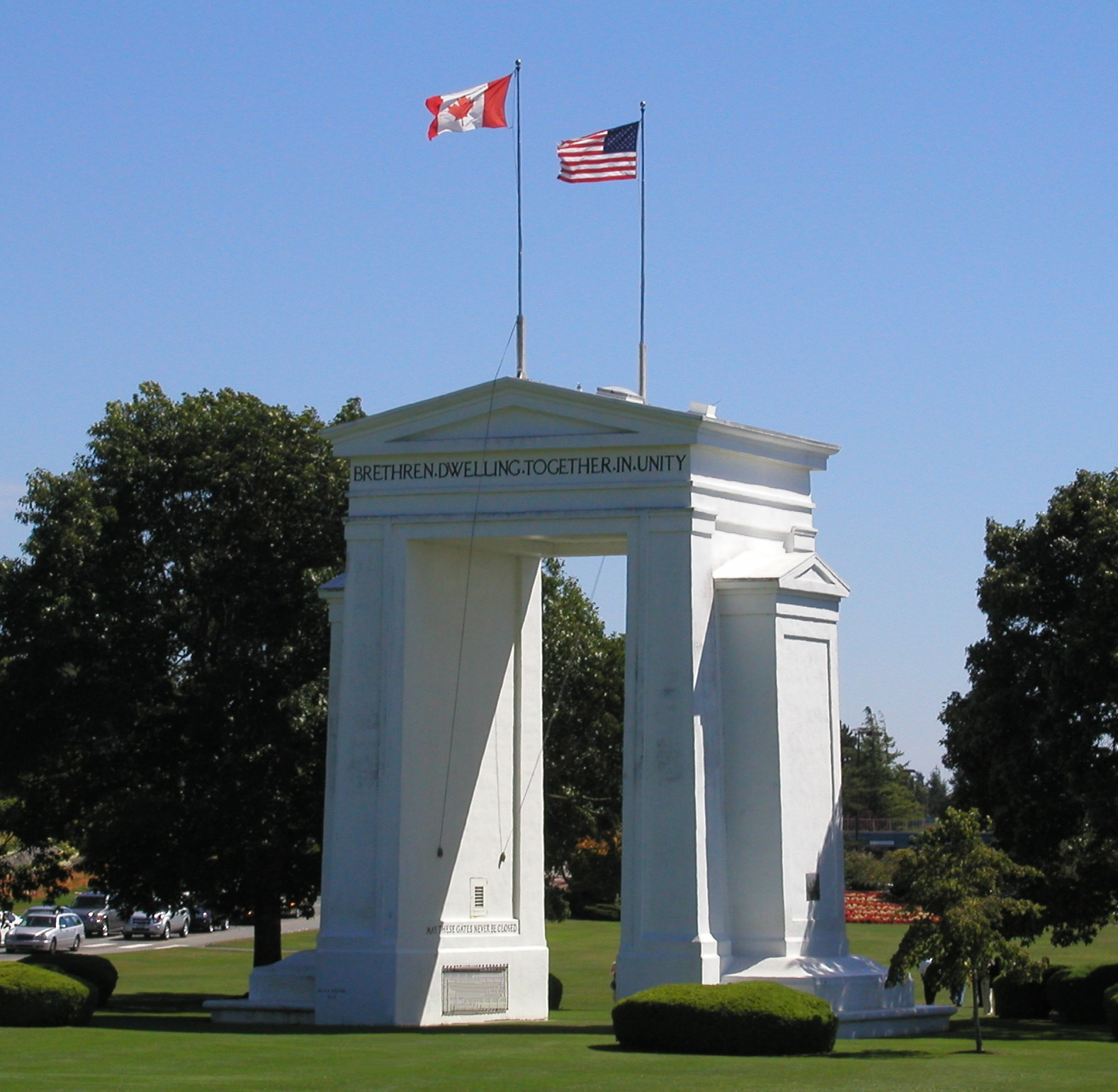
The Peace Arch monument on the Canadian border marks where I-5 enters British Columbia as Highway 99

From the Snohomish County line, the freeway turns north and descends into the Skagit Valley from Conway Hill, following the Skagit River that runs to its west. At Conway, I-5 intersects SR 534 and is joined by the BNSF railroad while continuing north towards Mount Vernon. The freeway narrows to four lanes within Mount Vernon and forms the boundary between the uphill suburban neighborhoods and downtown along the river. In downtown Mount Vernon, it intersects SR 536 in an interchange adjacent to the city's train station. At its next interchange, I-5 crosses the railroad and encounters SR 538, which connects the freeway to the Skagit Valley College and a minor retail corridor. The freeway then crosses the Skagit River into Burlington on a bridge that partially collapsed on May 23, 2013, and was subsequently renamed the Trooper Sean M. O'Connell Jr. Memorial Bridge after a state trooper who died while directing detour traffic during its rebuilding.

On the north side of the river, I-5 skirts the western edge of Burlington, passing car dealerships and retail stores, including the Cascade Mall and an outlet mall. To the west of downtown Burlington, the freeway intersects SR 20, a major state highway, in a partial cloverleaf interchange that includes several businesses inside the western loop. SR 20 continues west towards Anacortes and the Olympic Peninsula, and east through North Cascades National Park to the Okanogan Country as the North Cascades Highway. In northern Burlington, I-5 intersects the southern end of SR 11, which provides access to the western Chuckanut Mountains. I-5 crosses the railroad and the Samish River before reaching the Skagit Casino Resort and Skagit Speedway near Bow and Alger, located in the middle of the heavily forested Chuckanut foothills. The freeway then travels up into the Chuckanut Mountains and crosses into Whatcom County south of Lake Samish. The entire Skagit County section of I-5 is designated as the Skagit Valley Agricultural Scenic Corridor, a state scenic byway, in recognition of its agricultural industry.

I-5 travels along the eastern shore of Lake Samish before turning west to follow Chuckanut Creek through a narrow valley formed by the Chuckanut and Lookout mountains. At Lake Padden, it turns north and enters the city of Bellingham, intersecting SR 11 east of Fairhaven and the Alaska Marine Highway terminal. The freeway travels along the east side of Sehome Hill and downtown, passing the Western Washington University campus and several intersections with downtown streets. Northeast of downtown Bellingham, I-5 intersects SR 542 (the Mount Baker Highway) and turns west to meet SR 539 at the Bellis Fair Mall. The freeway heads northwest and leaves Bellingham after passing Bellingham International Airport, entering the predominately rural part of the Fraser Lowland region. I-5 continues northwest along the railroad, crossing the Nooksack River on a pair of truss bridges near downtown Ferndale and reaching a junction with SR 548 north of the city. SR 548 continues along the highway and travels west towards the Cherry Point Refinery and Birch Bay.

In Blaine, the northernmost city on I-5, SR 543 splits off to serve an alternate border crossing for trucks and freight. I-5 travels along the northeast edge of downtown Blaine and intersects SR 548 before it reaches the Canadian border at the Peace Arch, where the highway terminates. The monument was built in 1921 and its surrounding park is open to the public without needing to report to customs officers. The park is connected to its administrative buildings and parking lots by a set of crosswalks across the northbound and southbound lanes of Interstate 5. The Peace Arch–Douglas crossing is the third-busiest port of entry on the Canadian border, with an average of 3,500 to 4,800 vehicles crossing per day. The highway continues north as Highway 99 towards Vancouver, located 30 miles (48 km) northwest of Blaine.

== Seattle express lanes ==
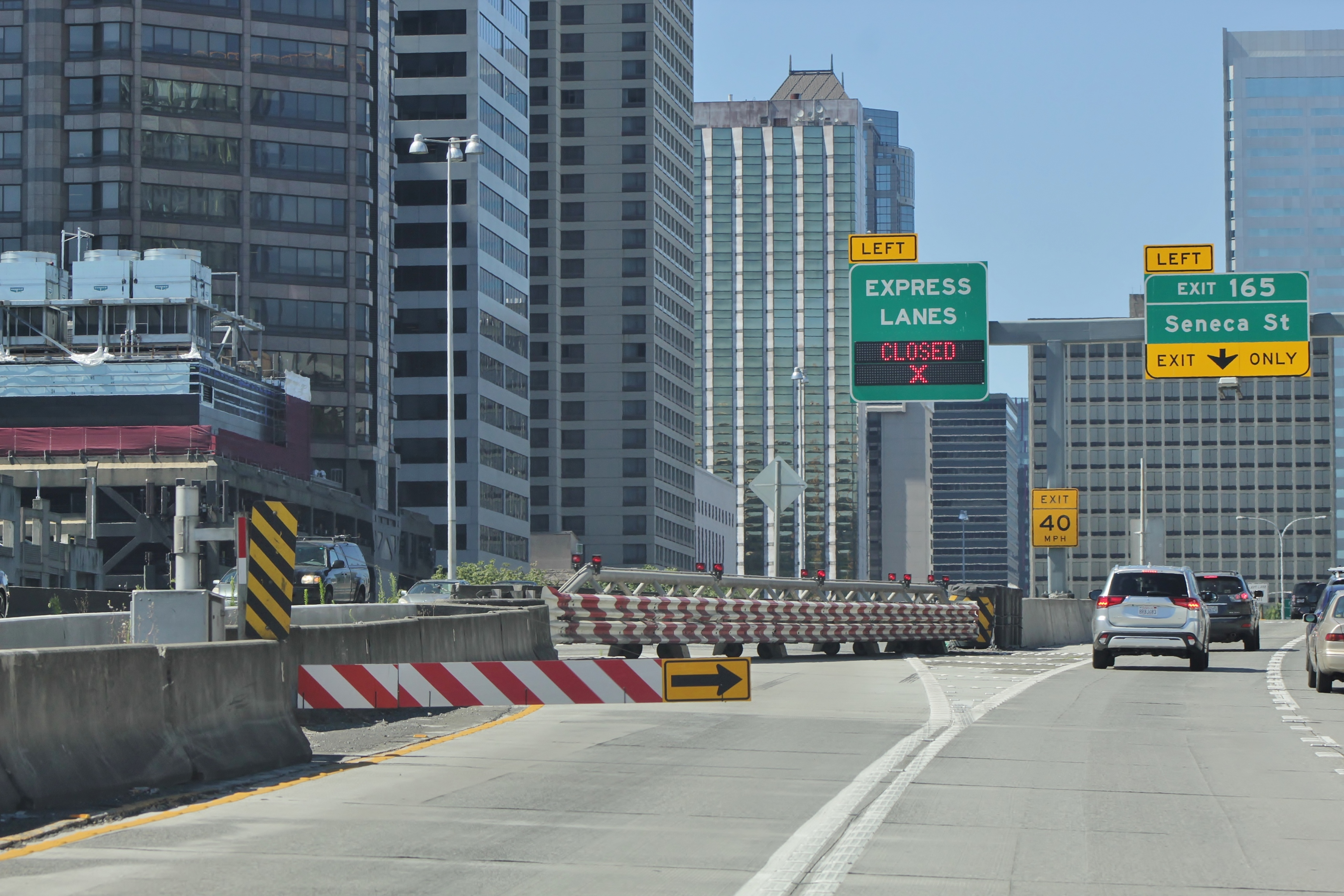
The northbound mainline entrance to the express lanes at Seneca Street, with barriers and signage indicating its closure

I-5 has 7.14 miles (11.49 km) of express lanes within Seattle, which reverse to carry traffic in the peak direction; the express lanes run in the median of the freeway between Downtown Seattle and Northgate, carrying 54,000 of the 270,000 vehicles on the Ship Canal Bridge on an average weekday, as measured in 2010. The express lanes split from I-5 near James Street, with ramps to the mainline near the northbound Seneca Street exit; the southernmost downtown exit is at 5th Avenue and Cherry and Columbia streets under the Seattle Municipal Tower and adjacent to Seattle City Hall.

The express lanes run through downtown and the Cascade neighborhood on the lower deck of I-5's southbound lanes, with ramps to the Pike Street at 9th Avenue (including a former exit to Downtown Seattle Transit Tunnel's Convention Place station), and Stewart and Howell streets at Eastlake Avenue. After the ramps from Mercer Street, the four-abreast express lanes emerge onto the median of I-5, following it past Capitol Hill and Eastlake to the Ship Canal Bridge. The express lanes cross the Ship Canal on the lower deck of the bridge, which includes an exit to Northeast 42nd Street in the University District. A southbound-only, HOV-only onramp from Ravenna Boulevard and an additional ramp to SR 522 connect the express lanes to North Seattle, leaving two express lanes and an HOV lane. The express lanes end southwest of the Northgate Mall, with a ramp to Northeast 103rd Street and the two remaining lanes merging onto I-5. The downtown entrances at Cherry, Columbia, and Pike streets are designated for HOV use only to encourage carpooling without affecting buses using the ramps.

The express lanes typically carry southbound traffic from 5 a.m. to 11 a.m. and northbound traffic from 11:15 a.m. to 11 p.m. on weekdays, with an overnight closure from 11 p.m. to 5 a.m. On most weekends, the lanes are open to southbound traffic from 8 a.m. to 1:30 p.m. and northbound traffic from 1:45 p.m. to 11 p.m., with an overnight closure to reduce neighborhood noise. The weekend times are sometimes adjusted for special events, including weekend sporting events, or construction on the mainline lanes in Seattle. The express lanes are controlled by a series of movable gates and electronic signs controlled by a remote operations center that relies on CCTV cameras and an inspection and sweep for abandoned vehicles by a ground crew, who also set up safety nets during the 15-minute switch-over. Prior to a $6.6 million project to automate the gates and signage in 2012, the switch-over took 50 minutes in total. During snowstorms and severe cold weather, WSDOT keeps the express lanes open in one direction for the entire day to prevent snow and ice from causing electronic failures in the automated gates.

=== Express lane exit list ===
The entire highway is in Seattle, King County.

mi	km	Destinations	Notes
165.29	266.01	I-5 south – Tacoma, Portland	South end of express lanes
165.62	266.54	5th Avenue, Columbia Street	Southbound exit and northbound entrance (HOV only)
166.49	267.94	Pike Street	Southbound exit and northbound entrance (HOV only)
166.63	268.16	Stewart Street – Seattle City Center	Southbound exit and northbound entrance
167.20– 167.26	269.08– 269.18	Mercer Street – Seattle Center	Southbound exit and northbound entrance
168.96	271.91	Northeast 42nd Street – University of Washington	Northbound exit and southbound entrance
169.66	273.04	Ravenna Boulevard	Southbound entrance only (HOV only)
170.54	274.46	SR 522 (Lake City Way) – Bothell	Northbound exit and southbound entrance
172.07	276.92	Northeast 103rd Street, 1st Avenue Northeast	Northbound exit and southbound entrance
172.43	277.50	I-5 north – Everett, Vancouver, BC	North end of express lanes
1.000 mi = 1.609 km; 1.000 km = 0.621 mi: HOV only

== History ==
=== Early state and national highways ===
The shields for Primary State Highway 1 and U.S. Route 99, both predecessors of I-5

The Pacific Highway was formed in 1913 by the state government as the north–south trunk in its first highway system, following the general route of modern-day I-5. The trunk route, one of three suggested by good roads activists for several years and studied by the state legislature in 1909, strung together several wagon trails dating back as early as the 1840s, when settlers arrived in the Puget Sound region from the Willamette Valley via the Cowlitz Trail. Part of the highway also followed the military road constructed in the 1850s from Fort Vancouver to Fort Bellingham.

The Washington section was part of a longer highway along the West Coast from Canada to Mexico, which was conceived by the Pacific Highway Association of North America in 1910. The Pacific Highway was dedicated by 60,000 people at the Peace Arch in Blaine on September 4, 1923, with a few sections still under construction. Earlier that year, the Washington state government had designated it as State Road 1 and allotted funds to pave some rural sections. By 1925, almost all of the highway had been paved or improved to modern standards.

The federal government and the American Association of State Highway Officials established a national highway system in 1926, designating most of the Pacific Highway north of Los Angeles as part of U.S. Route 99 (US 99). The highway's Washington segment would ultimately be completed four years later with the opening of several bridges between Everett and Marysville. It was also realigned in several areas to use newer cut-off roadways, bypassing older sections. The section between Burlington and Bellingham, historically on the water-facing Chuckanut Drive, was moved inland via Lake Samish in 1931. State Road 1 was re-designated in 1937 as Primary State Highway 1 under the state's new highway numbering system, but was not signed as such, giving priority to the overlapping US 99. By 1941, the Pacific Highway was the busiest road in the Pacific Northwest and had been widened to four lanes in most urban areas because of traffic congestion, necessitating studies into by-passing cities along the corridor.

=== State upgrades and Interstate planning ===
The federal government began planning for a national "superhighway" system in the late 1930s, including the US 99 corridor as the main route along the West Coast. The highway system, designed with a minimum of four lanes in rural areas and strict grade separation, was approved for limited funding by Congress in 1944 and planned by the Bureau of Public Roads over the following years. The US 99 corridor was included in the initial 37,700-mile (60,672 km) system announced three years later by the Public Roads Administration.

The state legislature adopted its own set of standards for limited-access highways in 1947, later amending them to encourage upgrades to existing two-lane roadways. In 1951, the legislature authorized a $66.7 million bond issue (equivalent to $644 million in 2024 dollars) to fund upgrades to US 99, including four-lane sections on all but 40 miles (64 km) of the highway and a modern "freeway" through Vancouver. The plan was opposed by Governor Arthur B. Langlie, who questioned its constitutionality on the basis that it could violate the state constitution's 18th amendment. The bond's use of future gas tax revenues to pay interest would, under some interpretations, violate the amendment's requirement that the gas tax must be used for highway purposes, using it instead to pay off debts. Later that year, the state supreme court upheld the legislature's authorization and allowed the program to move forward. A separate bill in 1953 authorized planning for a toll highway between Tacoma and Everett to replace the nearly-complete Alaskan Way Viaduct and other urban streets with grade crossings and 19 total interchanges.

The upgrade program was divided into 226 miles (364 km) of four-lane highway and 47 miles (76 km) of two-lane highway in rural sections between Marysville and Blaine. Construction on the rural sections in southwestern Washington began in late 1951 and the first section near Kalama was opened early the following year. Major bypasses of Centralia, Fort Lewis, Kelso, Marysville, and Tumwater were completed in 1954. The 2-mile-long (3.2 km) Vancouver freeway opened on April 1, 1955, constituting the state's first grade-separated freeway and costing $7 million (equivalent to $63.8 million in 2024 dollars) to construct. In December 1955, the section between Chehalis and Olympia was moved onto a straighter highway that bypassed Tenino and other small towns along the meandering route of the Pacific Highway. Its opening marked the end of the southern section of the upgraded US 99. The northern section was declared complete after a bypass of Mount Vernon and Burlington, including a new bridge over the Skagit River, was opened to traffic in June 1957.

The Federal-Aid Highway Act of 1956, signed into law by President Dwight D. Eisenhower on June 29, 1956, formally authorized the creation and majority-federal funding of the Interstate Highway System. A few months later, the state supreme court overturned the $194 million authorization (equivalent to $1.71 billion in 2024 dollars) to build the 65-mile (105 km) Tacoma–Everett expressway as a toll road after finding it to be unconstitutional. The federal contribution under the Interstate Highways program was anticipated to be $165 million (equivalent to $1.45 billion in 2024 dollars), but come in smaller installments that would require more time to complete the freeway project. The entire US 99 corridor was subsequently assigned the designation of "Interstate 5" in 1957 and the federal government allocated planning funds to begin engineering of the Seattle Freeway, which commanded its own Highway Department division.

=== Suburban and rural construction ===
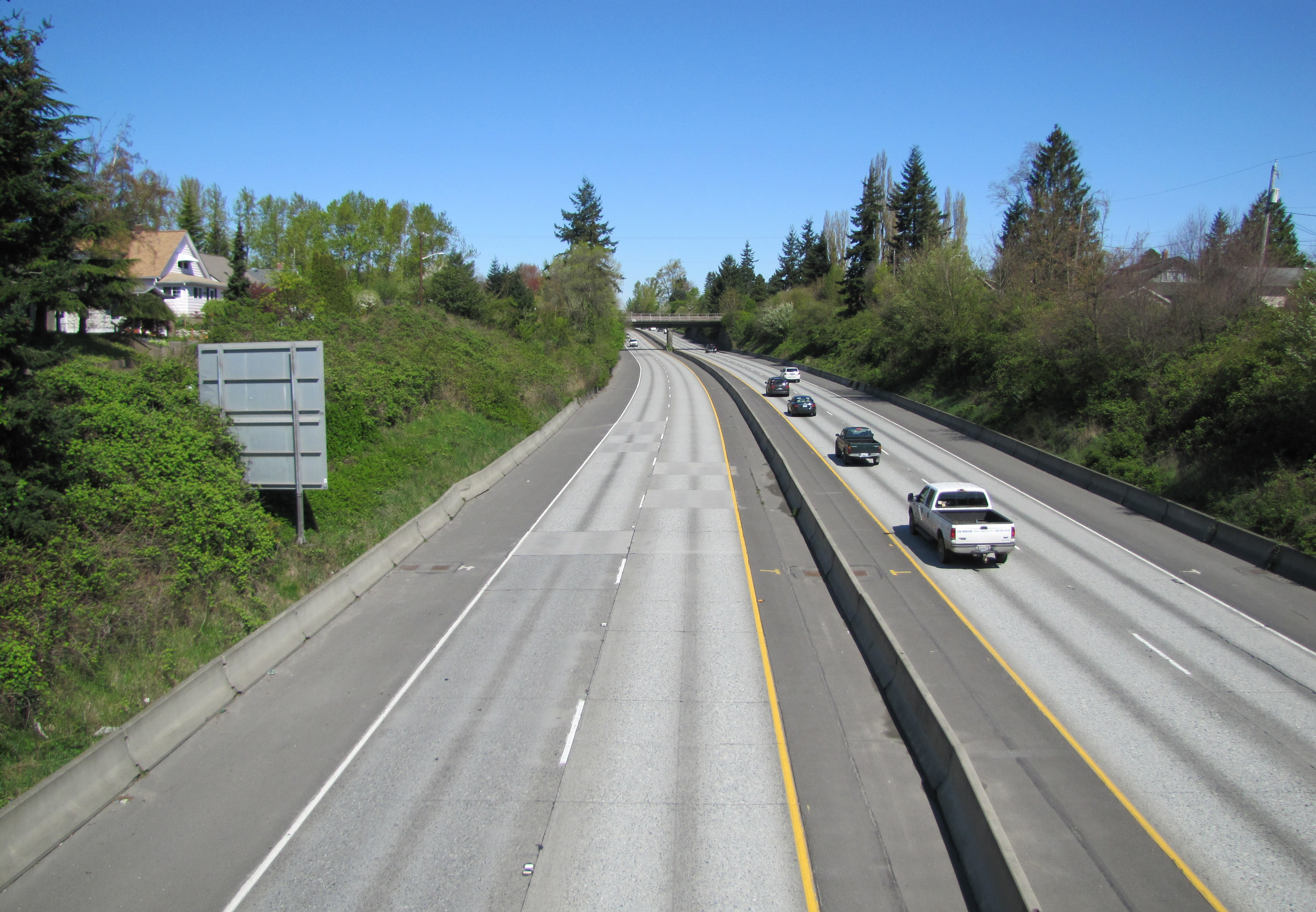
I-5 was routed around downtown Bellingham and opened in 1960

Washington was the fastest of the three West Coast states to upgrade sections of US 99 to four lanes and partial Interstate standards using new interchanges, with only 15 miles (24 km) of the highway in northern Whatcom County still two-laned by 1959. Among the first projects to use federal funding from the 1956 act was an upgrade of the Fort Lewis highway to four-lane freeway standards, which opened in September 1957 and included the relocation of the military base's main gate to a new cloverleaf interchange. Another early Interstate project, the 6.5-mile (10.5 km) Olympia Freeway, was opened to traffic on December 12, 1958, at a cost of $11.6 million (equivalent to $96.5 million in 2024 dollars). It also included a freeway section of US 101 and US 410 that intersected I-5 in the state's first three-level interchange. A rural section of freeway between Marysville and Mount Vernon was completed in early 1959.

The first section of the Tacoma–Seattle–Everett freeway was opened to traffic on October 1, 1959, extending the Fort Lewis freeway 5 miles (8.0 km) from Gravelly Lake near McChord Field to South 72nd Street in southern Tacoma. The $4.68 million project (equivalent to $38.4 million in 2024 dollars) built the six-lane freeway and a cloverleaf interchange at SSH 5G (now SR 512). The Tacoma section was also the first to use the Interstate highway shield, which was installed during construction in 1958. By the end of 1959, new interchanges and overpasses had brought most of the highway between Vancouver and Olympia to Interstate standards. Governor Albert D. Rosellini announced an accelerated push for freeway construction, primarily aimed at completing Interstate 5 between Seattle and the Canadian border, in August 1960.

The Tacoma section was extended 13.5 miles (21.7 km) north to Midway (near Des Moines) on October 10, 1962. The dedication ceremony was attended by Governor Rosellini and included a parade of U.S. Army vehicles from Fort Lewis. The Tacoma–Midway section cost $14.5 million to construct (equivalent to $140 million in 2024 dollars) and included a cloverleaf interchange for the Auburn cutoff (later SR 18) in Federal Way. The ceremony had been preceded by drivers trespassing onto the finished but unopened freeway a month earlier to avoid congestion on US 99. The Tacoma and Olympia sections of I-5 were connected by a new freeway across Fort Lewis and the Nisqually River that opened in November 1968 and cost $12 million (equivalent to $82.4 million in 2024 dollars). Its opening eliminated the last traffic signal between Seattle and Portland.

I-5 was routed around Bellingham on an easterly arc with several interchanges that were added after lobbying by downtown business groups who had originally favored a waterfront route. The first section, 5 miles (8.0 km) long and four lanes wide, opened to traffic on December 5, 1960, connecting with an existing expressway to Ferndale. The remainder of I-5 from Ferndale to the Peace Arch border crossing was upgraded in two stages, beginning with 11 miles (18 km) to Dakota Creek near Blaine that opened on October 29, 1963. The last section through Blaine was delayed by construction issues and opened on November 23, 1965, with a dedication ceremony at the Peace Arch. The British Columbian government had already completed upgrades to its section of Highway 99 between Blaine and the Fraser River in 1962. The southernmost section of the Bellingham Freeway through the Chuckanut Mountains opened in three stages in 1966, completing the last four-lane section of the highway in the state.

The 19.7-mile (31.7 km) section between north Seattle and Everett was opened on February 3, 1965. It was constructed over sections of the former Seattle–Everett Interurban Railway and cost $23 million (equivalent to $174 million in 2024 dollars). Several of the freeway's interchanges in southern Snohomish County were opened two months later. The freeway was initially six lanes wide but was expanded to eight lanes from Northgate to modern-day Shoreline in 1966 because of increased traffic congestion. The 3-mile (4.8 km) bypass of downtown Everett between 41st Street and the Snohomish River was completed on January 18, 1968; its opening eliminated fourteen traffic lights and included ramps to connect with the Hewitt Avenue Trestle. The final section of I-5 was opened on May 14, 1969, spanning 3.5 miles (5.6 km) between Everett and Marysville over the Snohomish River delta. It was originally scheduled to open several months earlier, but delayed steel work on the bridge over the Snohomish River caused scheduling issues.

Several right-in/right-out intersections and non-grade-separated sections remained on I-5 until the completion of widening and grade separation projects in the 1970s. The section between northern Kelso and Castle Rock was improved to Interstate standards and widened to six lanes in 1976, which was followed by an expansion through Kelso that opened in 1981. The Kelso expansion project included relocating the freeway away from a mudslide-prone hill, transferring maintenance of the old alignment to the city government. A similar six-lane expansion project in Marysville in the late 1960s was delayed after a dispute between the state government and Tulalip Tribes over compensation for land that was later settled in 1970. A section further north of Marysville was expanded to six lanes in 1972, including a new bridge over the Stillaguamish River for northbound traffic and replacement of a railroad underpass with a pair of overpasses.

=== Seattle planning and construction ===
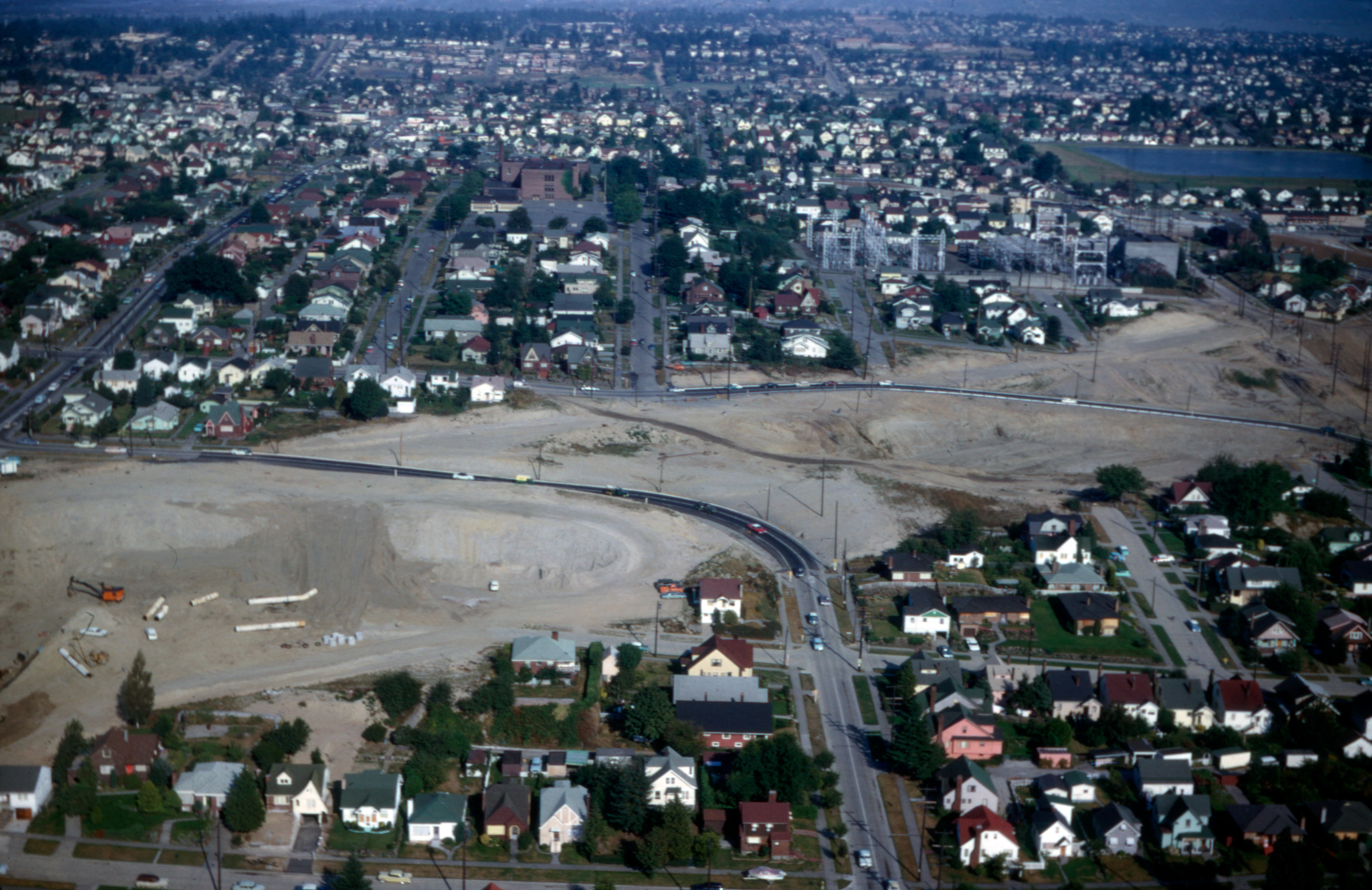
Land clearing for I-5 near Green Lake in north Seattle, pictured in 1963

A municipal traffic plan from 1946 outlined designs for a north–south freeway through Seattle that was later refined into the early concepts for Interstate 5 in the 1950s. A design from 1954 proposed an eight-lane facility from Downtown Seattle to Ravenna that would cost $194 million (equivalent to $1.79 billion in 2024 dollars) to construct. Alternate plans would have placed the freeway further east on 12th Avenue in Capitol Hill or along Empire Way, which would later be used for the proposed R. H. Thomson Expressway. A larger, twelve-lane freeway through Downtown Seattle with a reversible express lane system was announced in April 1957 ahead of a series of public hearings. The proposal received a mix of strong support and criticism from members of the public, while the city government endorsed the plan with a caveat that right of way along the freeway be reserved for use by rapid transit. The twelve-lane design, sans transit, was approved the following year by the Bureau of Public Roads, allowing for property acquisition to begin. A dedicated office was created to handle property acquisition, which would require 4,500 parcels of land, and 10 percent were condemned by the government.

The first section of the freeway within Seattle to be built was the Ship Canal Bridge, a double-decker bridge over the Lake Washington Ship Canal between the University District and Eastlake, which began construction in August 1958. Construction of the freeway through Downtown Seattle was delayed after 100 citizens marched on June 1, 1961, in protest of the "trench" design and sought to add a lidded tunnel with a rooftop park. The proposed design change was deferred for later consideration, but delayed the start of construction south of Olive Way to the following year.

Land acquisition for the downtown section of I-5 was completed in June 1962 after a series of condemnations were settled by the King County Superior Court. Demolition of buildings along the block-wide right-of-way had already begun, including the Kalmar Hotel (built in 1881), which pre-dated the Great Seattle Fire, and the Seventh Avenue Fire Hall (built in 1890), the oldest public building in the city. The demolitions were opposed by local preservationists, among them architects Victor Steinbrueck and Paul Thiry, but proceeded as planned. Thiry described the freeway's construction as when "Seattle began taking one of its wrong turns and started to lose its identity as a city" and proposed a park lid from Columbia Street to Olive Way along the entire downtown section of I-5. Seattle's Chinatown was divided by the construction of I-5, which resulted in the formation of a special district to preserve the neighborhood's Asian American heritage.

The Ship Canal Bridge and 2.2 miles (3.5 km) of freeway between Ravenna Boulevard and Roanoke Street were dedicated and opened to traffic on December 18, 1962. The bridge cost $14 million to construct (equivalent to $111 million in 2024 dollars) and was among the largest ever built in the Pacific Northwest. After the opening of the Evergreen Point Floating Bridge on August 28, 1963, traffic from the bridge was permitted to use a section of I-5 between SR 520 and Mercer Street. Traffic from the North Seattle section, which had been extended north from Ravenna Boulevard to Bothell Way (SR 522), was diverted until a through connection was opened on November 12. The section in the Ravenna neighborhood also included a 300-person fallout shelter under the freeway at Weedin Place that was completed in 1963 and later used for records storage before its abandonment. Some sections of the extensive retaining walls along I-5 were pre-assembled at a plant in Woodinville and hoisted in place by a crane to reduce working hours in residential neighborhoods.

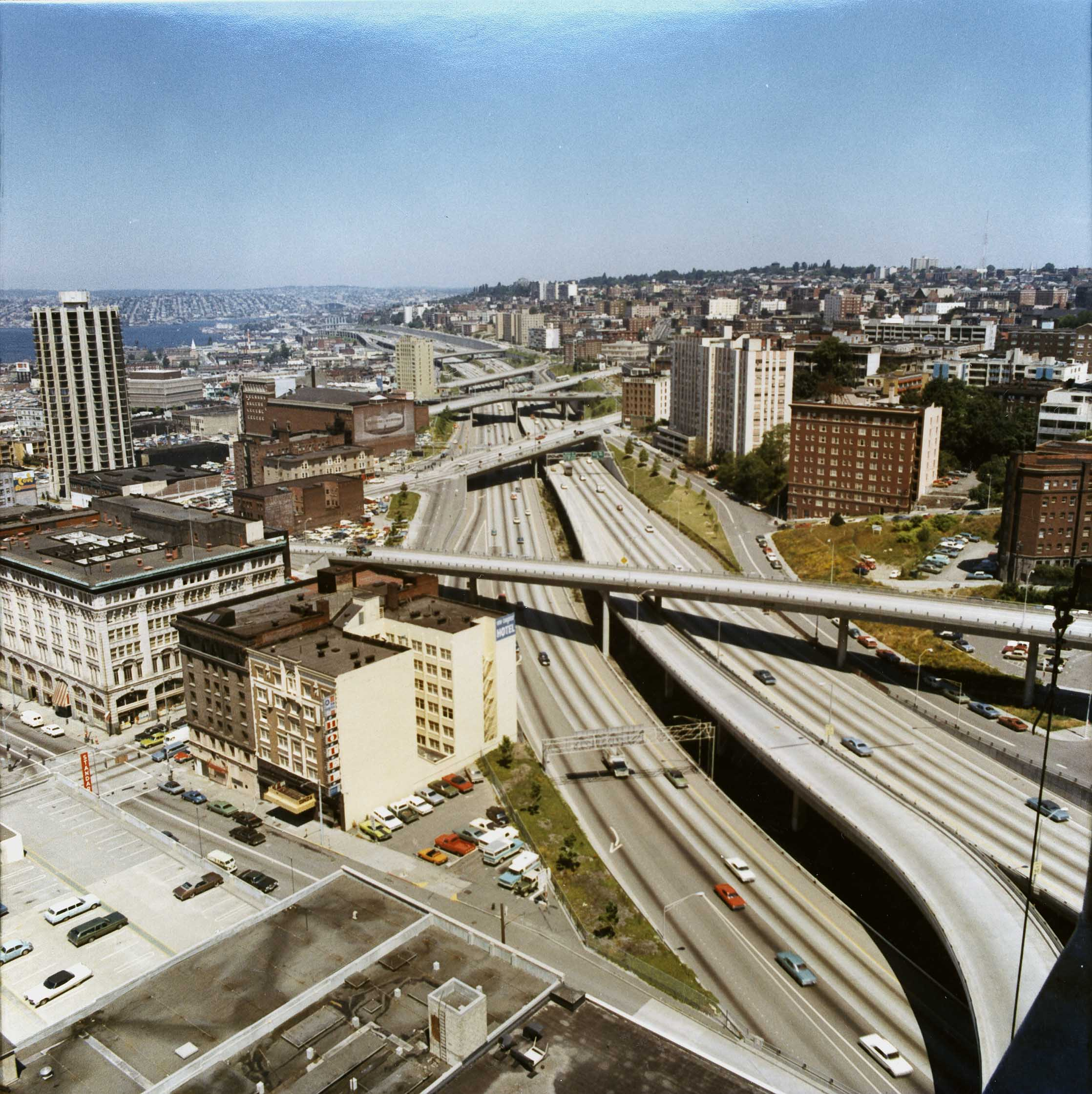
The completed downtown section of I-5, looking north from University Street in 1971, before the construction of Freeway Park and the Seattle Convention Center

The remaining downtown section and approaches from the suburbs remained scheduled to be completed by 1967, with the state legislature passing a provision in a spending bill to accelerate construction. The delayed timeline was blamed by the Department of Highways on several uncontrollable factors, among them landslides along Beacon Hill and Capitol Hill, unfavorable weather, a cement masons strike, and relocation of utilities. The section between Olive Way and Mercer Street opened to limited traffic on October 30, 1964, with two northbound lanes to bypass congestion at the Mercer Street interchange. Two additional downtown interchanges at University Street and Cherry Street opened on June 30, 1966. Access to the northbound lanes of I-5 was extended to South Dearborn Street in late September 1966, while opening of the southbound section was delayed because of issues with the Airport Way exit. The Connecticut Street interchange, intended to be part of I-90 and connected to the Alaskan Way Viaduct, was partially constructed as part of the downtown section of I-5 but was left unfinished until 1991. The remainder of the Seattle section, a 17.2-mile (27.7 km) stretch from Midway to Olive Way, was opened to traffic on January 31, 1967, by Governor Dan Evans.

The reversible express lane system was built along with the rest of I-5 through Seattle and opened in separate phases. The first section of reversible lanes opened on June 2, 1965, with 13 access ramps between Olive Way and Northgate Mall. The express lanes were managed using a series of ramp barriers that were remotely controlled and monitored by eleven closed-circuit television cameras that were activated in September 1965. An additional ramp at the Mercer Street interchange opened in October 1966 after southbound traffic was diverted to a new set of ramps. The southernmost section of the express lanes, including ramps to Columbia and Cherry streets at 5th Avenue, opened on January 31, 1967. The new ramps were later converted to bus-only use as part of the Blue Streak express bus program, which debuted in 1970 and was later replaced by a King County Metro route.

=== Major projects and expansions ===
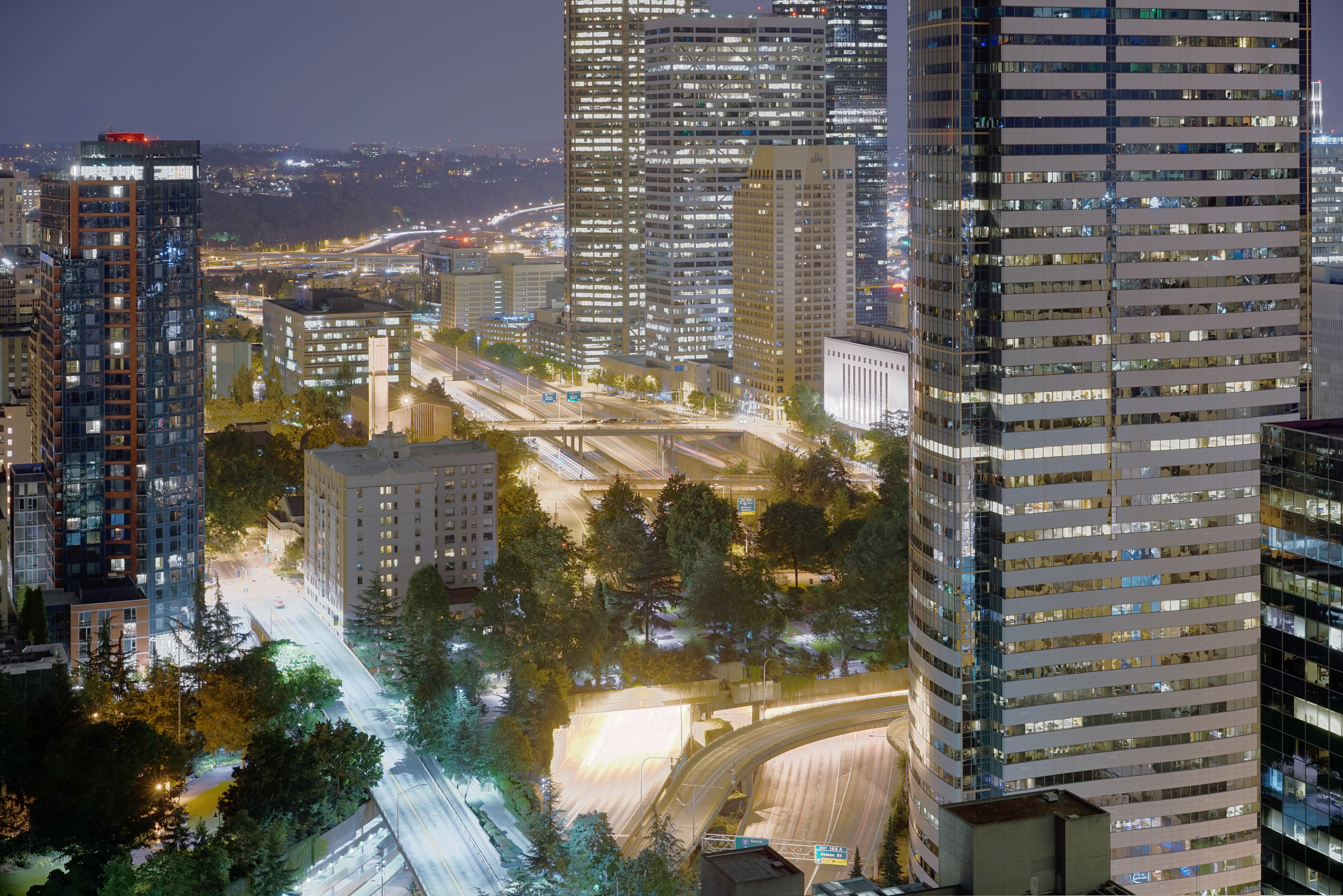
Aerial view of Freeway Park, looking south

The First Hill Improvement Club and architect Paul Thiry led a campaign in 1961 to reconnect areas of Seattle severed by the freeway with lids that would house parks, parking garages, and other buildings through leased air rights. The lid proposal was approved in October 1969 with funding split between the local government, state government, the Forward Thrust bonds program, and a private developer. Landscape architects Lawrence Halprin and Angela Danadjieva were selected to design the park lid and adjoining parking garages, which would incorporate Brutalist elements and a series of waterfalls.

The 5.5-acre (2.2 ha) Freeway Park opened on July 4, 1976, incorporating pedestrian and open spaces between Seneca and University streets that continued up the northwest slope of First Hill. The Washington State Convention and Trade Center (now the Seattle Convention Center) was constructed north of Freeway Park over a section of I-5 and opened in 1988. Part of the convention center complex was designed by Danadjieva as a continuation of Freeway Park, while the main structure rested on a series of trusses over I-5. In 2019, the Seattle city government approved funding for a feasibility study for an expanded downtown lid after lobbying from a grassroots campaign. The I-5 Colonnade, a 7.5-acre (30,000 m^{2}) mountain bike park, opened in 2007 under an elevated section of the freeway between Eastlake and Capitol Hill.

WSDOT began installing ramp meters in 1981 to address worsening onramp congestion on I-5 from Seattle to Mountlake Terrace. The first set of 16 ramp meters were activated on September 30, 1981, with a computer system controlling entry at 5–15 second increments; some ramps also had un-metered bypass lanes for transit and three-person carpools. The state's first set of HOV lanes opened in August 1983 for use by buses and carpools from Northgate to Mountlake Terrace. By the late 1980s, the 36 miles (58 km) of HOV lanes had reduced average travel times on I-5 by four minutes despite an 86 percent increase in traffic volumes. The HOV lanes were extended north to Lynnwood in 1996 and southern Everett by the end of the decade, while the carpool minimum was lowered to two people per vehicle.

In the 1970s, the state government began planning extensive rebuilding of the oldest sections of I-5 to meet newer Interstate standards and eliminate design issues. The 6.5-mile (10.5 km), four-lane section through Tumwater, Olympia, and Lacey was rebuilt in the 1980s at a cost of $164 million (equivalent to $336 million in 2024 dollars). The freeway project was completed in late 1991 with an expansion to six lanes, six rebuilt interchanges, a new bridge for Capitol Way, and improved landscaping. The existing Pacific Avenue interchange near the Tacoma Dome was expanded in the 1980s to accommodate I-705, a new spur freeway traveling north to downtown Tacoma.

The rebuilding of the three-mile (4.8 km) Vancouver section was completed in August 1983 at a cost of $40 million (equivalent to $106 million in 2024 dollars). It included widening the freeway to six lanes, new interchanges with SR 14 and SR 500, relocation of railroad tracks, and the replacement of several overpasses. An additional expansion project on I-5 through Vancouver and Hazel Dell was completed in 2001, replacing the original overpasses and adding a southbound HOV lane. The HOV lane was later removed in 2005 after drivers complained about increased travel times for single-occupant vehicles. A second widening project, completed in 2006, added two lanes on a from Hazel Dell to the I-205 interchange in Salmon Creek, where a new ramp to Northeast 139th Street was later opened in 2014.

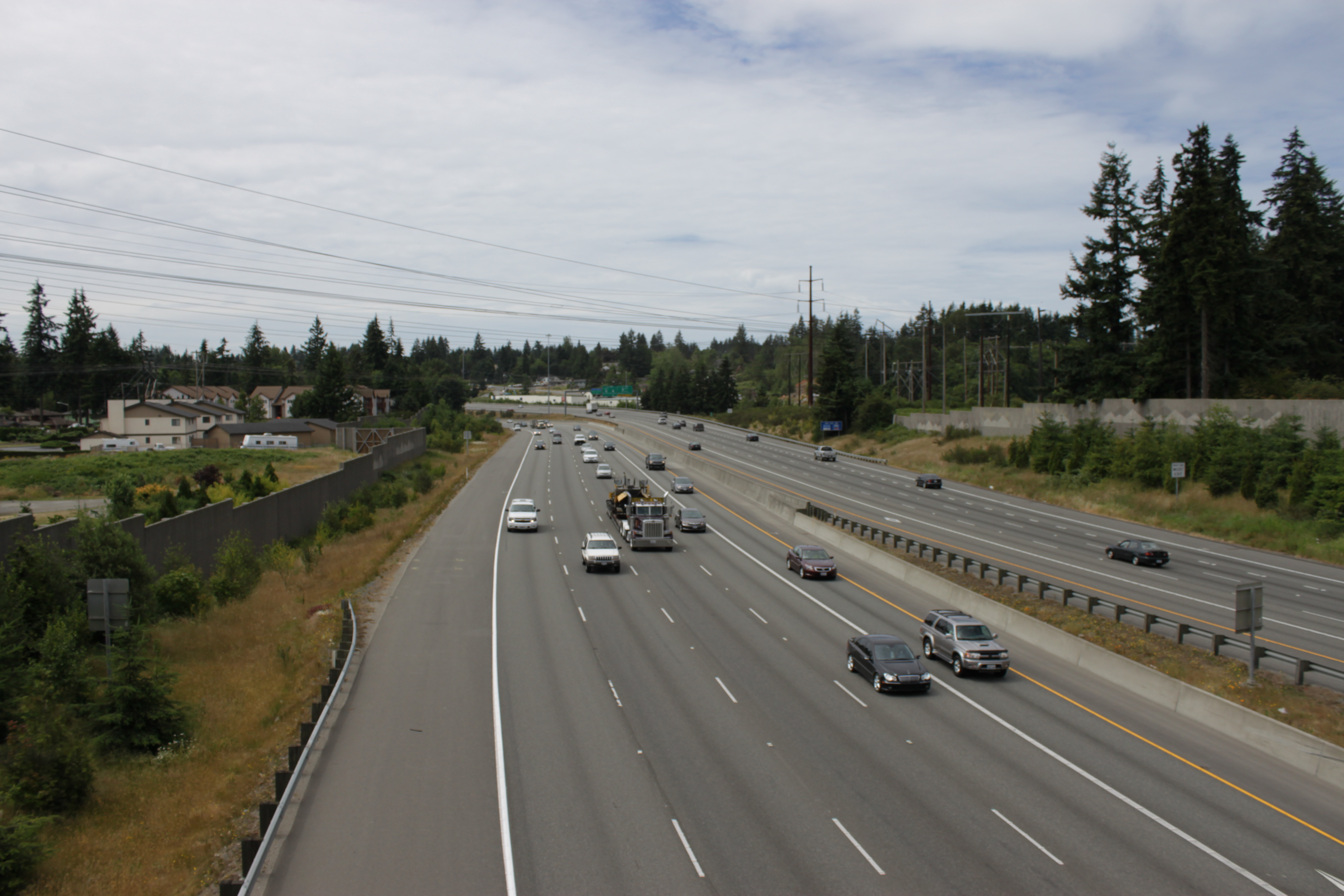
An expanded section of I-5 in Everett, featuring HOV lanes and sound walls

In April 2003, the state legislature passed the Nickel Funding Package, which enacted a five-cent gas tax increase to fund $4.2 billion in transportation projects (equivalent to $6.84 billion in 2024 dollars) that were rejected in an earlier public referendum. The program funded several projects to widen and modernize sections of I-5, including new interchanges in Clark County and the extension of HOV lanes in Everett and from Tukwila to Tacoma. Several direct access ramps for the HOV lanes were constructed in the 2000s using funds from Sound Transit to serve bus facilities in Lynnwood and Federal Way. The Everett expansion project cost $263 million to construct and consisted of HOV lanes from the Everett Mall to the Snohomish River, realigned ramps, a new single-point urban interchange at 41st Street, and a reconstructed Broadway interchange with HOV ramps and a flyover ramp. Construction began in September 2005 under a design–build contract, the third in WSDOT's history, and was completed in June 2008 as part of an accelerated timeline to prepare for the 2010 Winter Olympics hosted by Vancouver, British Columbia.

The southern end of the HOV lanes on I-5 in King County was extended to SR 516 in 1995 and Federal Way in 2007 using Nickel Package funding. Construction of an HOV lane system through Tacoma, which would also include a new interchange with SR 16 and the Nalley Valley Viaduct, began in 2001 with the replacement of the South 38th Street overpass to accommodate a wider freeway. The Tacoma/Pierce County HOV program launched with partial funding for the $1.6 billion megaproject that was later filled with an earmark in the state legislature's 2005 transportation funding package. Construction on the HOV lanes began in 2009 with an extension through Fife to Port of Tacoma Road and seismic retrofitting of bridges that was completed two years later. The reconstructed SR 16 opened in two phases, with the new westbound viaduct carrying all between its opening in June 2011 and the completion of the eastbound viaduct in August 2014. A set of ramps connecting the HOV lanes of I-5 and SR 16 on the Nalley Valley Viaduct opened in November 2019.

WSDOT broke ground on the longest section of the Tacoma HOV program, spanning 4 miles (6.4 km) from SR 16 to Port of Tacoma Road, in July 2014. The reconstructed section was completed in November 2018 with a new set of collector–distributor lanes, a carriageway for the northbound lanes of I-5 through the I-705 interchange, the replacement of two overpasses, and extended retaining walls for excavated areas. WSDOT began the final phase of the project, replacement of the Puyallup River crossing with wider bridges on a straighter alignment, in February 2015. The 1,569-foot (478 m) northbound bridge was completed in October 2017 and all traffic was shifted to it beginning in June 2019. The southbound bridge was opened to traffic in April 2022 and the HOV lanes were fully opened from Fife to SR 16 in late August.

The 2003 and 2005 gas tax programs also funded improvements to I-5 in areas outside of the central Puget Sound region, including $322 million for lane expansions on a 18-mile (29 km) corridor in Lewis and Thurston counties. The existing four-lane section from US 12 in Grand Mound to SR 121 in Maytown gained a third lane in each direction that opened in November 2010 at a cost of $61.5 million. The following year, the six-lane section was extended south by four miles (6.4 km) to Blakeslee Junction near Centralia. Widening of the eight-mile (13 km) section through Centralia to six lanes was completed in 2016 and also included the addition of collector–distributor lanes, three reconstructed interchanges, and flood control measures. A 20-mile (32 km) section of the freeway from Chehalis to Grand Mound had closed for four days during December 2007 floods that covered the roadway in 10 feet (3.0 m) of water from the Chehalis River.

WSDOT was also allocated funding from the 2003 and 2005 packages to repair bridges on I-5 and add cable barriers to sections of I-5 in Lewis, Skagit, Snohomish, and Whatcom counties. A section through Marysville was later upgraded to a concrete barrier in 2010 after several fatal crossover collisions despite a reduction in the speed limit to 60 mph (97 km/h). Other parts of the packages funded seismic retrofitting for bridges and overpasses, and the implementation of smart highway technology in 2010 that included variable speed limit signs in the Seattle area. In May 2023, a third northbound lane from Seneca Street to Olive Way and ramp meters for the collector–distributor lanes and the Cherry Street onramp were added to I-5 to improve weaving.

=== Incidents and closures ===
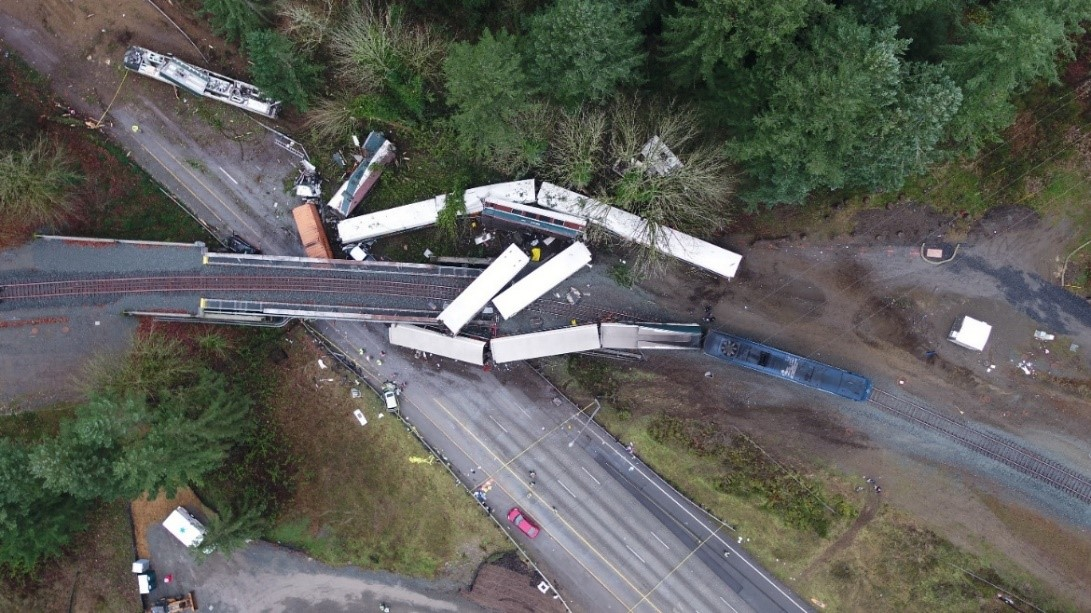
Aerial view of the 2017 Amtrak derailment over southbound I-5 in DuPont

On May 23, 2013, the northernmost span of the Skagit River bridge between Mount Vernon and Burlington collapsed after a semi-trailer truck struck an overhead beam. The collapse caused two vehicles to fall into the river, where all three people were later rescued with minor injuries. The incident triggered a state of emergency and discussions about the state of national infrastructure. A temporary span was assembled using prefabricated steel sections and opened to limited traffic on June 19, 2013. A permanent replacement for the span was built west of the bridge and slid into place before opening to traffic on September 15, 2013.

A section of I-5 was closed for several hours on December 18, 2017, after an Amtrak Cascades passenger train derailed onto the southbound lanes near DuPont. The train had been on the inaugural trip on the new Point Defiance Bypass route, constructed along the freeway between Nisqually and Tacoma Dome Station, which was subsequently closed. The derailment, which killed three passengers and injured more than 70 others, was caused by high speeds on a curved section of track approaching the I-5 overpass.

The Seattle section of I-5 has been the site of several large protests and demonstrations since its construction. A demonstration against the U.S. invasion of Cambodia at the University of Washington on May 5, 1970, held in response to the Kent State shootings, culminated in 5,000 protesters marching onto the Ship Canal Bridge en route to Downtown Seattle. An attempted protest on the freeway the following day was stopped by local police and state troopers armed with tear gas and clubs. The city government sanctioned a march in the express lanes on May 8 that was attended by 15,000 people as other protests continued for several days. The 1999 WTO Conference protests included minor disruptions to I-5 traffic while police blocked access from ramps in Downtown Seattle. Several Black Lives Matter protests in 2014, 2016, and 2020 resulted in long nighttime shutdowns of the freeway in Seattle and Olympia. The 2020 George Floyd protests included over a month of nightly protests on I-5 with a non-intervention policy implemented by the Washington State Patrol and precautionary closures. The non-intervention policy was suspended after a July 4 incident in which a driver evaded the blockades and struck two protesters on I-5, killing one.

=== Future projects and proposals ===
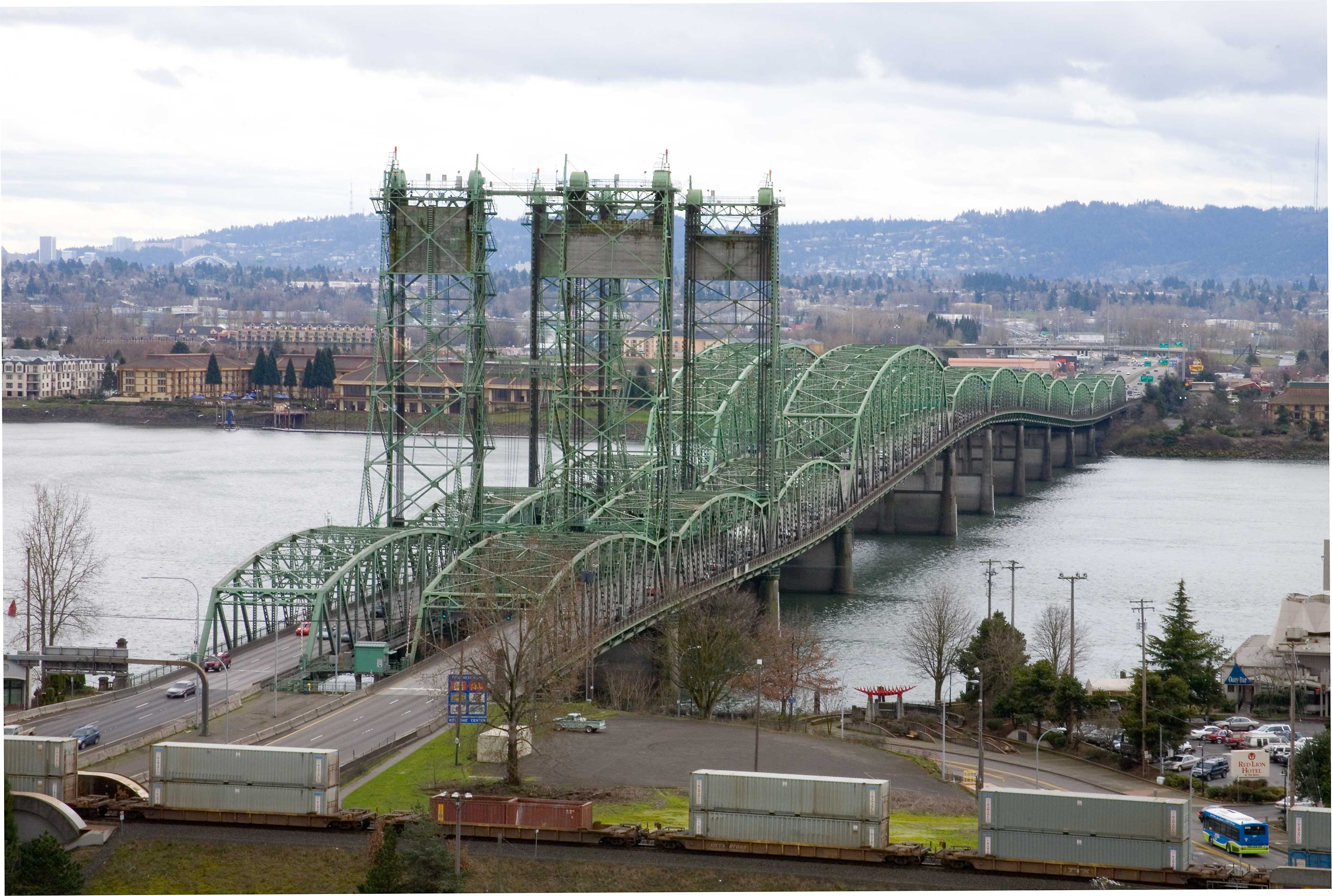
The Interstate Bridge, a pair of movable bridges that carry I-5 over the Columbia River, are planned to be replaced in the 2020s

Within the Puget Sound region, preservation and maintenance of I-5 is expected to cost $2.5 billion between 2020 and 2040, and substantial rebuilding of the freeway will be required. WSDOT began extensive repaving of the highway in the Seattle area in the 2010s, alongside repairs to expansion joints and other deteriorating structures during weekend closures. Pavement replacement and expansion joint repairs on the section between Yesler Way and North 117th Street in Seattle is expected to begin in 2023 and take four years to complete. Portions of the freeway's right-of-way will be used for extensions of Sound Transit's Link light rail system, which is planned to extend north to Lynnwood and south to Federal Way by 2025. As part of the reconstruction of SR 520, a new HOV ramp from the I-5 reversible lanes to SR 520 is planned to be opened in early 2024, alongside a fifth reversible lane for HOVs that extends south to Mercer Street.

The 2015 Connecting Washington transportation funding package included allocations for several major projects on I-5, among them an expansion in the Joint Base Lewis–McChord area and several new and reconstructed interchanges in Lacey and Marysville. Widening of an eight-mile (13 km) section through the military base and neighboring DuPont to eight lanes began in October 2018 and is planned to be completed in 2025; the project also includes reconstruction of several interchanges and accommodations for the adjacent Point Defiance Bypass railroad corridor. The SR 510 interchange in Lacey was reconstructed into the state's first diverging diamond interchange, which opened in 2020.

The northbound HOV lane is planned to be extended from Everett to Marysville by late 2024 as part of a $123 million retrofit project that began construction in 2022. It will also include an expansion of the SR 529 interchange in southern Marysville into a full interchange to provide a bypass for a congested railroad crossing on SR 528. A new interchange at 156th Street in northern Marysville is planned to open in the late 2020s. The Puget Sound Gateway Program, scheduled to be completed in 2028 will include the construction of two interchanges on I-5, at the Port of Tacoma to serve a realigned SR 167 and near SeaTac for an extension of SR 509.

The Vancouver section of I-5 was planned to be rebuilt as part of the Columbia River Crossing program, which would have replaced the six-lane Interstate Bridge with a wider bridge at a cost of approximately $3.4 billion. The northern approach to the bridge would have included a collector–distributor system with a maximum width of 16 lanes. The program was cancelled in 2013 after $175 million had been spent planning because of opposition within the Washington state legislature, but the bridge proposal has been revived several times since. A new panel of legislators from both states was convened in 2018 to study the bridge project, with funding to continue planning work in time for federal deadlines on loan repayment. Oregon and Washington plan to submit an environmental review in 2023 and begin construction in 2025 if funding is found for the project. The bridge replacement is expected to cost up to $2.45 billion, while the entire program—including reconstruction of several interchanges and transit improvements—is estimated to cost $5.5 billion to $7.5 billion.

== Exit list ==
County	Location	mi	km	Exit	Destinations	Notes
Columbia River		0.00	0.00	—	I-5 south – Portland	Continuation into Oregon
Columbia River		0.00	0.00	Interstate Bridge		
Clark	Vancouver	0.41	0.66	1A	SR 14 east / Lewis and Clark Trail – Camas	
Clark	Vancouver	0.45	0.72	1B	6th Street – Vancouver City Center, Convention Center	Northbound exit and southbound entrance
Clark	Vancouver	1.05	1.69	1C	SR 501 (Mill Plain Boulevard) – Vancouver City Center, Port of Vancouver	
Clark	Vancouver	1.58	2.54	1D	4th Plain Boulevard	
Clark	Vancouver	2.35	3.78	2	SR 500 east / 39th Street	
Clark	Vancouver	3.07	4.94	3	Northeast Highway 99, Main Street	
Clark		4.36	7.02	4	Northeast 78th Street	
Clark		5.39	8.67	5	Northeast 99th Street	
Clark		7.24	11.65	7A	Northeast 134th Street – Washington State University Vancouver	Northbound exit and southbound entrance; southbound exit is via I-205 (exit 36)
Clark		7.47	12.02	7B	Northeast 139th Street	No southbound exit
Clark		7.50	12.07	7	I-205 south to I-84 / SR 14 / Northeast 134th Street – Salem, Washington State University Vancouver	Southbound exit and northbound entrance
Clark		9.51	15.30	9	Northeast 179th Street – Clark County Event Center	
Clark		11.20	18.02	11	SR 502 east (Northeast 219th Street) – Battle Ground	
Clark	Ridgefield	14.21	22.87	14	SR 501 south (Pioneer Street) – Ridgefield	
Clark	La Center	16.80	27.04	16	Northwest La Center Road – La Center, Cowlitz Reservation	
Cowlitz	Woodland	21.08	33.92	21	SR 503 east – Woodland, Cougar	
Cowlitz	Woodland	22.72	36.56	22	Dike Access Road	
Cowlitz		27.70	44.58	27	Todd Road – Port of Kalama	
Cowlitz	Kalama	29.84– 30.64	48.02– 49.31	30	Kalama	
Cowlitz		32.28	51.95	32	Kalama River Road	
Cowlitz	Kelso	36.97	59.50	36A	Kelso Drive	No southbound exit
Cowlitz	Kelso	36.97	59.50	36	Talley Way – Kelso Industrial Area	Signed as exits 36B northbound and 36A southbound
Cowlitz	Kelso	36.97	59.50	36	SR 432 west to SR 4 / US 30 – Longview, Long Beach, Kelso	
Cowlitz	Kelso	39.88	64.18	39	SR 4 west (Allen Street) / Lewis and Clark Trail – Kelso	
Cowlitz	Kelso	40.77	65.61	40	North Kelso Avenue – Lower Columbia College, Long Beach	
Cowlitz		42.73	68.77	42	Lexington Bridge Drive	
Cowlitz		46.20	74.35	46	Headquarters Road, Pleasant Hill Road	
Cowlitz	Castle Rock	48.04	77.31	48	I-5 BL north (Huntington Avenue) – Castle Rock	
Cowlitz	Castle Rock	49.91	80.32	49	SR 411 south (I-5 Bus. south) / SR 504 east – Castle Rock, Toutle, Mount St. Helens National Volcanic Monument	
Cowlitz		52.72	84.84	52	Barnes Drive, Toutle Park Road	
Lewis		57.41	92.39	57	Jackson Highway, Barnes Drive	
Lewis		59.27	95.39	59	SR 506 west – Vader, Ryderwood	
Lewis		60.98	98.14	60	SR 506 west (Toledo Vader Road)	
Lewis		63.49	102.18	63	SR 505 – Winlock, Toledo	
Lewis		68.48	110.21	68	US 12 east – Morton, Yakima	South end of US 12 overlap
Lewis	Napavine	71.12	114.46	71	SR 508 east – Napavine, Onalaska	
Lewis	Napavine	72.85	117.24	72	Rush Road	
Lewis	Chehalis	74.78	120.35	74	Labree Road	
Lewis	Chehalis	76.62	123.31	76	13th Street	
Lewis	Chehalis	78.04	125.59	77	SR 6 west – Pe Ell, Raymond	
Lewis	Chehalis	79.15	127.38	79	Chamber Way	
Lewis	Centralia	81.74	131.55	81	SR 507 north (Mellen Street) – Centralia City Center	Southbound access is via exit 82
Lewis	Centralia	82.80	133.25	82	Harrison Avenue, Factory Outlet Way	
Thurston		88.40	142.27	88	US 12 west – Aberdeen, Tenino	North end of US 12 overlap
Thurston		95.28	153.34	95	SR 121 north – Littlerock, Maytown	
Thurston	Tumwater	99.35	159.89	99	SR 121 south (93rd Avenue Southwest)	
Thurston	Tumwater	101.37	163.14	101	Tumwater Boulevard – Olympia Regional Airport	
Thurston	Tumwater	102.86	165.54	102	Trosper Road – Black Lake	
Thurston	Tumwater	104.05	167.45	103	Deschutes Way, 2nd Avenue	
Thurston	Tumwater	104.39	168.00	104	US 101 north – Aberdeen, Port Angeles	
Thurston	Olympia	105.52	169.82	105A	State Capitol, Olympia City Center	Signed as exit 105 northbound
Thurston	Olympia	105.82	170.30	105B	Port of Olympia	Signed as exit 105 northbound
Thurston	Olympia	107.52	173.04	107	Pacific Avenue	
Thurston	Olympia	108.46	174.55	108A	Sleater–Kinney Road south	No northbound entrance; signed as exit 108 southbound
Thurston	Olympia	108.46	174.55	108B	Sleater–Kinney Road north	No northbound entrance; southbound exit is via exit 109
Thurston	Olympia	108.96	175.35	108C	College Street	Northbound exit only
Thurston	Lacey	109.19	175.72	109	Martin Way	
Thurston	Lacey	112.01	180.26	111	SR 510 east (Marvin Road) – Yelm	
Thurston		114.36	184.04	114	Nisqually	
Pierce		116.77	187.92	116	Mounts Road – Old Nisqually	
Pierce	DuPont	118.02	189.93	118	Center Drive – DuPont City Center	
Pierce	DuPont	119.07	191.62	119	Steilacoom–DuPont Road	
Pierce	Joint Base Lewis–McChord	120.93	194.62	120	41st Division Drive – Joint Base Lewis–McChord	
Pierce	Lakewood	122.74	197.53	122	Berkeley Street	
Pierce	Lakewood	123.64	198.98	123	Thorne Lane	
Pierce	Lakewood	124.70	200.69	124	Gravelly Lake Drive	
Pierce	Lakewood	125.92	202.65	125	Bridgeport Way – McChord Field	
Pierce	Lakewood	127.54	205.26	127	SR 512 east / South Tacoma Way – Puyallup	
Pierce		128.98	207.57	128	South 84th Street	Southbound exit is via exit 129
Pierce	Tacoma	129.65	208.65	129	South 72nd Street, South 74th Street, South 84th Street	
Pierce	Tacoma	130.75	210.42	130	South 56th Street, Tacoma Mall Boulevard – University Place	
Pierce	Tacoma	131.89	212.26	132	SR 16 west (South 38th Street) – Gig Harbor, Bremerton, Tacoma Mall	
Pierce	Tacoma	133.76	215.27	133	I-705 north / SR 7 south (38th Street) / East 26th Street – Tacoma City Center	
Pierce	Tacoma	134.93	217.15	134	Portland Avenue	Southbound exit is via exit 135
Pierce	Tacoma	135.09	217.41	135	SR 167 north – Puyallup	
Pierce	Fife	136.15	219.11	136	20th Street East – Port of Tacoma	Signed as exits 136A (20th Street) and 136B (Port of Tacoma) northbound
Pierce	Fife	137.51	221.30	137	SR 99 north (54th Avenue East) – Fife	
Pierce	Fife			138	SR 167 south / SR 509 north	proposed
King	Federal Way	142.06	228.62	142	SR 18 (South 348th Street) – Auburn	Signed as exits 142A (east) and 142B (west) northbound
King	Federal Way	143.89	231.57	143	South 320th Street – Federal Way	
King	Federal Way	144.08	231.87	♦	South 317th Street	HOV only
King	Kent	146.87	236.36	147	South 272nd Street	
King	Kent	149.23	240.16	149	SR 516 – Kent, Des Moines	
King	SeaTac			150	SR 509 Toll north / 24th Avenue South	Northbound exit and southbound entrance
King	SeaTac	151.24	243.40	151	Military Road, South 200th Street	
King	SeaTac	152.32	245.14	152	South 188th Street, Orillia Road South	
King	Tukwila	154.19	248.14	153	Southcenter Parkway – Tukwila, Southcenter Mall	Northbound exit and southbound entrance
King	Tukwila	154.46	248.58	154A	SR 518 west – Sea-Tac Airport, Burien	Signed as exit 154B southbound
King	Tukwila	154.46	248.58	154B	I-405 north – Bellevue, Renton	Signed as exit 154A southbound
King	Tukwila	154.71	248.98	154B	Southcenter Boulevard – Southcenter Mall	Southbound exit and northbound entrance via Klickitat Drive
King	Tukwila	156.00	251.06	156	SR 599 north / Interurban Avenue – Tukwila	Split into two interchanges with some movements requiring the use of an interchange on SR 599.
King	Tukwila	157.40	253.31	157	SR 900 east (M. L. King Way)	No northbound exit to eastbound SR 900; no southbound entrance from westbound SR 900
King	Tukwila	158.07	254.39	158	Boeing Access Road, East Marginal Way, Airport Way	
King	Seattle	161.27	259.54	161	Swift Avenue, Albro Place	
King	Seattle	161.37– 161.60	259.70– 260.07	162	Corson Avenue, Michigan Street	
King	Seattle	163.03	262.37	163A	Columbian Way, West Seattle Bridge, Spokane Street – Lumen Field, T-Mobile Park	Signed as exit 163 northbound
King	Seattle	163.54	263.19	163B	Forest Street, 6th Avenue South	Southbound exit only
King	Seattle	164.33	264.46	164	Airport Way	Southbound exit only
King	Seattle	164.55	264.82	164A	I-90 east – Bellevue, Spokane	Signed as exit 164 southbound; I-90 exits 2A-B eastbound, 2B-C westbound
King	Seattle	164.55	264.82	164B	4th Avenue South, Airport Way, E. Martinez Drive (to SR 519) – Ferries	Signed as exit 164 southbound
King	Seattle	164.68	265.03	164	Dearborn Street	Signed as exit 164A northbound; no southbound entrance
King	Seattle	165.35	266.11	—	Express Lanes	Northbound exit and southbound entrance
King	Seattle	165.38	266.15	165A	James Street	Signed as exit 164A northbound
King	Seattle	165.63	266.56	164A	Madison Street – Convention Center	Northbound exit only
King	Seattle	165.75	266.75	165	Seneca Street	Northbound exit and southbound entrance
King	Seattle	165.81	266.85	165B	Union Street	Southbound exit and northbound entrance
King	Seattle	166.26	267.57	166	Olive Way	Northbound exit and entrance
King	Seattle	166.42	267.83	166	Stewart Street, Denny Way	Southbound exit and entrance
King	Seattle	166.97	268.71	167	Mercer Street – Seattle Center	
King	Seattle	167.73	269.94	168A	Lakeview Boulevard	Northbound exit and southbound entrance
King	Seattle	168.12	270.56	168B	SR 520 – Bellevue, Kirkland	
King	Seattle	168.18	270.66	168A	Boylston Avenue, Roanoke Street	Southbound exit and northbound entrance
King	Seattle	168.40– 169.07	271.01– 272.09	Ship Canal Bridge		
King	Seattle	169.44	272.69	169	Northeast 45th Street	
King	Seattle	169.69	273.09	169	Northeast 50th Street	
King	Seattle	170.31	274.09	170	Ravenna Boulevard, Northeast 65th Street	Northbound exit and southbound entrance
King	Seattle	170.70	274.72	171	Northeast 71st Street, Northeast 65th Street	Southbound exit and northbound entrance
King	Seattle	170.87	274.99	171	SR 522 (Lake City Way) – Bothell	Northbound exit and southbound entrance
King	Seattle	171.56	276.10	172	North 85th Street to Aurora Avenue North (SR 99), Northeast 80th Street	
King	Seattle	172.58	277.74	—	Express Lanes	Southbound exit and northbound entrance
King	Seattle	172.82	278.13	173	Northgate Way, 1st Avenue Northeast	
King	Seattle	173.89	279.85	174	Northeast 130th Street, Roosevelt Way	Northbound exit and southbound entrance
King	Seattle–Shoreline city line	174.64	281.06	175	SR 523 (Northeast 145th Street) / 5th Avenue Northeast	
King	Shoreline	175.58	282.57	♦	Metro Transit Base	Buses and transit vehicles only
King	Shoreline	176.19	283.55	176	Northeast 175th Street – Shoreline	
King–Snohomish county line	Shoreline–Mountlake Terrace city line	177.81	286.16	177	SR 104 – Edmonds, Lake Forest Park	
Snohomish	Mountlake Terrace	178.33	286.99	178	236th Street Southwest – Mountlake Terrace	Northbound exit and southbound entrance
Snohomish	Mountlake Terrace	179.35	288.64	179	220th Street Southwest – Mountlake Terrace	
Snohomish	Lynnwood	180.69	290.79	♦	46th Avenue West (Lynnwood Park & Ride)	HOV only
Snohomish	Lynnwood	180.77	290.92	181A	To SR 524 / 44th Avenue West – Lynnwood	Northbound exit and southbound entrance
Snohomish	Lynnwood	181.59	292.24	181B	SR 524 (196th Street Southwest) / Alderwood Mall Parkway – Lynnwood	Signed as exit 181 southbound
Snohomish		182.67	293.98	182	I-405 south – Renton, Bellevue	
Snohomish		182.67	293.98	182	SR 525 north to SR 99 – Mukilteo	Northbound exit and southbound entrance
Snohomish		183.96	296.05	183	164th Street Southwest	
Snohomish		184.21	296.46	♦	Ash Way	Northbound exit and southbound entrance (buses only)
Snohomish		186.49	300.13	186	SR 96 east / 128th Street Southwest – Paine Field	
Snohomish	Everett	187.80	302.23	♦	112th Street Southeast – S. Everett Park & Ride	HOV only
Snohomish	Everett	189.37	304.76	189	SR 99 south (Everett Mall Way) / SR 526 west / SR 527 south / Broadway – Mukilteo, Whidbey Island Ferry, Paine Field	
Snohomish	Everett	192.51	309.81	♦	Broadway	Northbound exit southbound entrance (HOV only)
Snohomish	Everett	192.72	310.15	192	41st Street (to Evergreen Way), Broadway	
Snohomish	Everett	193.69	311.71	193	SR 529 (Pacific Avenue) – Everett City Center	Northbound exit and southbound entrance
Snohomish	Everett	193.98	312.18	194	US 2 east – Snohomish, Wenatchee	
Snohomish	Everett	194.08	312.34	194	SR 529 (Everett Avenue) – Everett City Center	Southbound exit and northbound entrance
Snohomish	Everett	194.87	313.61	195	Marine View Drive – Port of Everett	Northbound exit and southbound entrance
Snohomish	Marysville	198.33	319.18	198	SR 529 south / North Broadway – Port of Everett	Southbound exit and northbound entrance
Snohomish	Marysville–Tulalip line	199.17	320.53	199	SR 528 east – Marysville, Tulalip	
Snohomish	Marysville–Tulalip line	200.84	323.22	200	88th Street Northeast, Quil Ceda Way	
Snohomish	Marysville–Tulalip line	202.52	325.92	202	116th Street Northeast	
Snohomish	Marysville–Arlington city line	206.13	331.73	206	SR 531 (172nd Street Northeast)	
Snohomish	Arlington	208.72	335.90	208	SR 530 east – Arlington, Darrington	
Snohomish		210.36	338.54	210	236th Street Northeast	
Snohomish		212.71	342.32	212	SR 532 west – Stanwood, Camano Island	
Snohomish		215.09	346.15	215	300th Street Northwest	
Skagit		218.61	351.82	218	Starbird Road	
Skagit		221.13	355.87	221	SR 534 east – Lake McMurray	
Skagit		224.00	360.49	224	Old Highway 99 South	Northbound exit and southbound entrance
Skagit	Mount Vernon	225.19	362.41	225	Anderson Road	
Skagit	Mount Vernon	226.45	364.44	226	SR 536 west (Kincaid Street)	
Skagit	Mount Vernon	227.79	366.59	227	SR 538 east (College Way)	
Skagit	Burlington	228.93	368.43	229	George Hopper Road	
Skagit	Burlington	230.20	370.47	230	SR 20 – Burlington, Anacortes	
Skagit	Burlington	231.27	372.19	231	SR 11 north (Chuckanut Drive) – Bow, Edison, Burlington	
Skagit		232.89	374.80	232	Cook Road – Sedro-Woolley	
Skagit		236.45	380.53	236	Bow Hill Road – Bow, Edison	
Skagit		240.99	387.84	240	Alger	
Whatcom		242.92	390.94	242	Nulle Road – South Lake Samish	
Whatcom		246.30	396.38	246	North Lake Samish	
Whatcom	Bellingham	250.79	403.61	250	SR 11 south (Old Fairhaven Parkway, Chuckanut Drive) – Alaska Marine Highway	
Whatcom	Bellingham	252.14	405.78	252	Samish Way – Western Washington University	
Whatcom	Bellingham	253.03	407.21	253	Lakeway Drive	
Whatcom	Bellingham	253.85	408.53	254	Iowa Street, Ohio Street, State Street	
Whatcom	Bellingham	254.88	410.19	255	SR 542 east (Sunset Drive) – Mt. Baker	
Whatcom	Bellingham	256.27	412.43	256	SR 539 north (Meridian Street) / Bellis Fair Mall – Lynden	Signed as exits 256A (SR 539) and 256B (Bellis Fair Mall Parkway) northbound
Whatcom	Bellingham	257.04	413.67	257	Northwest Avenue	
Whatcom	Bellingham	257.72	414.76	258	Bakerview Road – Bellingham International Airport	
Whatcom	Ferndale	260.19	418.74	260	Slater Road – Lummi Island	
Whatcom	Ferndale	262.63	422.66	262	Main Street – Ferndale City Center	
Whatcom	Ferndale	263.52	424.09	263	Portal Way	
Whatcom	Ferndale	266.04	428.15	266	SR 548 north (Grandview Road) – Custer	
Whatcom		270.30	435.01	270	Birch Bay, Lynden	
Whatcom	Blaine	274.23	441.33	274	Peace Portal Drive – Semiahmoo	Northbound exit and southbound entrance
Whatcom	Blaine	275.21	442.91	275	SR 543 north to Highway 15 – Pacific Border Crossing (Truck Customs)	Northbound exit and southbound entrance
Whatcom	Blaine	276.26	444.60	276	SR 548 south – Blaine City Center, Peace Arch State Park	
Whatcom	Blaine	276.62	445.18	Canada – United States border at Peace Arch Border Crossing		
Whatcom	Blaine	276.62	445.18	—	Highway 99 north – Vancouver	Continuation into British Columbia
1.000 mi = 1.609 km; 1.000 km = 0.621 mi: Concurrency terminus; HOV only; Incomplete access; Unopened

Interstate 5
Previous state: Oregon	Washington	Next state: Terminus
