= Lake Samish =

Lake in Whatcom County, Washington, US

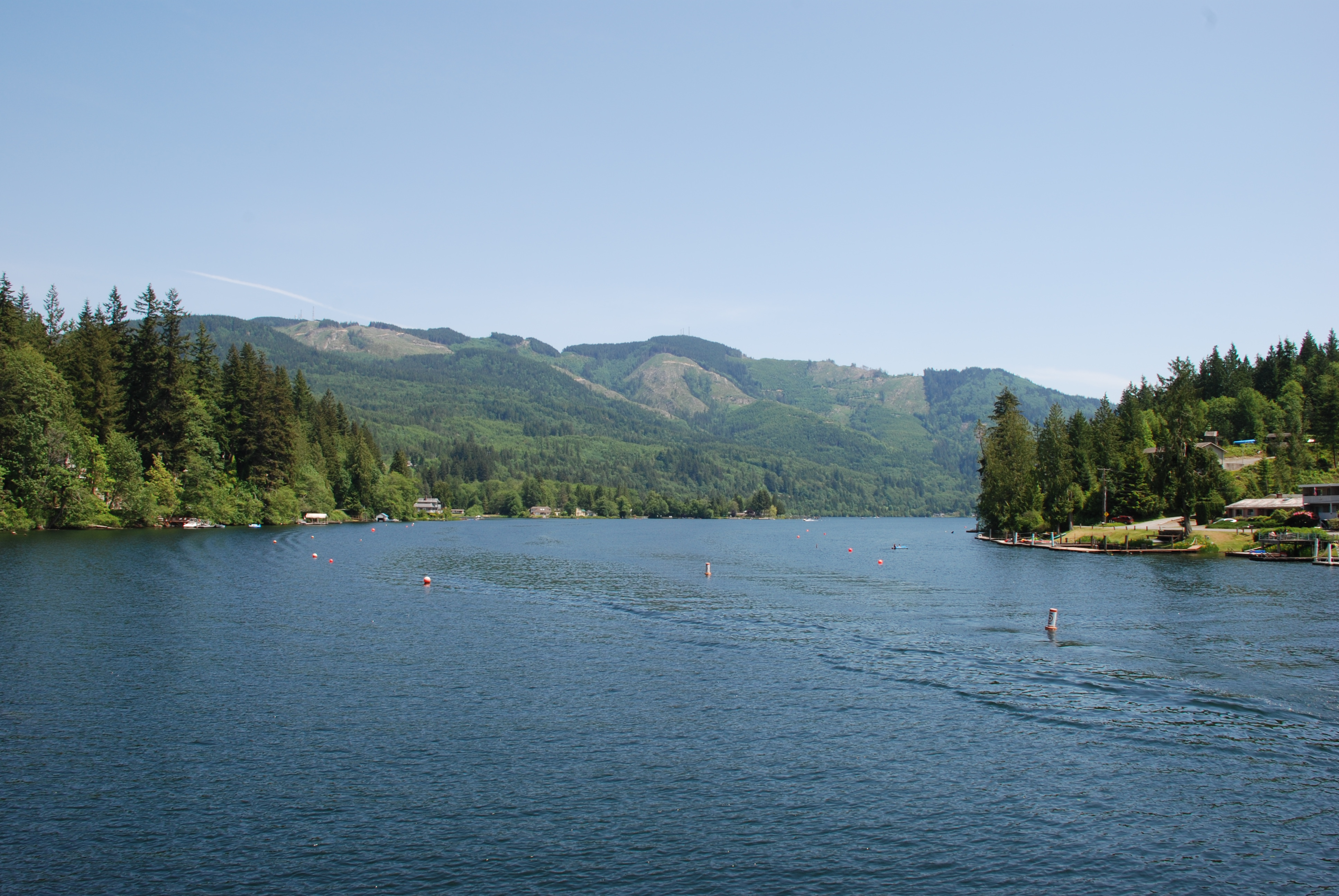

- Location within Washington (state) Location within the United States
- Location: Whatcom County, Washington
- Coordinates: 48°40′N 122°23′W
- Primary outflows: Friday Creek
- Basin countries: United States
- Surface elevation: 276 ft (84 m)

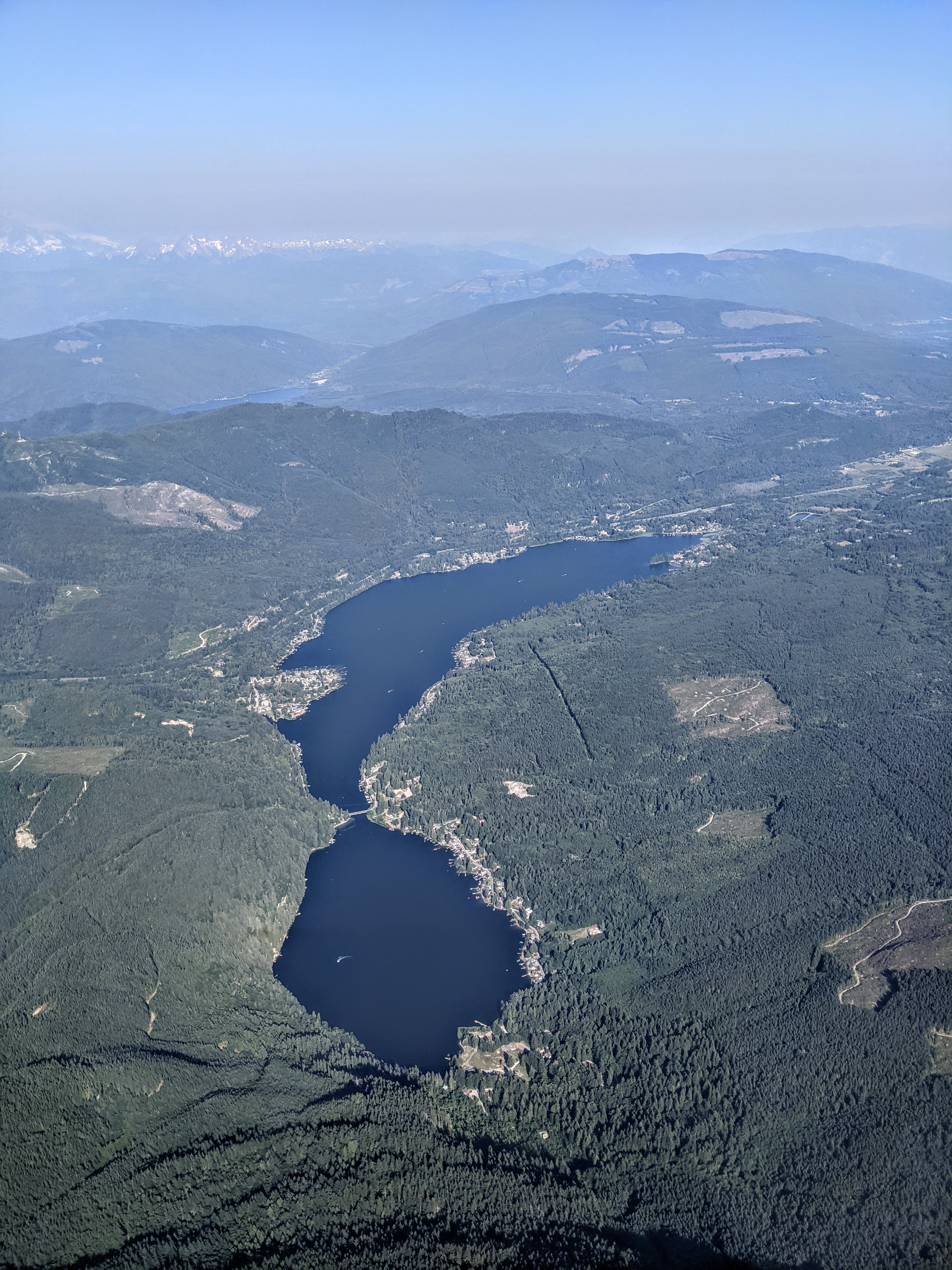
Lake Samish aerial view from the west

Lake Samish (/ˈsæmɪʃ/ SAM-ish) is a lake south of Bellingham, Washington, United States.

Visible to the west of Interstate 5 when travelling between Alger and Bellingham, Lake Samish is heavily used for recreation in the summer months by local residents. The lake shoreline is heavily developed and homesites cover almost the entire shoreline. Lake Samish is bordered on the south by Blanchard Mountain and on the north by Chuckanut Pass. Public access is limited but a Whatcom County park with a rough boat launch is located along the northern shore. The state of Washington operates a modern boat launch on the east shore of the lake.

In pre-colonial days, members of the Samish tribe lived at sites on the lake. In 1873 the Northern Pacific Railway Company made a preliminary survey through the Lake Samish valley on the way to Bellingham Bay and Hudson's Bay Company trappers had also probably been through the area before that but the first Europeans to settle at Lake Samish were Charlie Barns and William Harris, who staked claims to 160 acres each in March/April 1885, Barns on the east side and Harris on the west side of the lake. In 1931, a new highway connecting Seattle to Vancouver was constructed on the east side of the lake and designated part of U.S. Route 99. This road was later replaced by Interstate 5.

Notable residents include Hilary Swank, who grew up on a trailer park next to the lake.

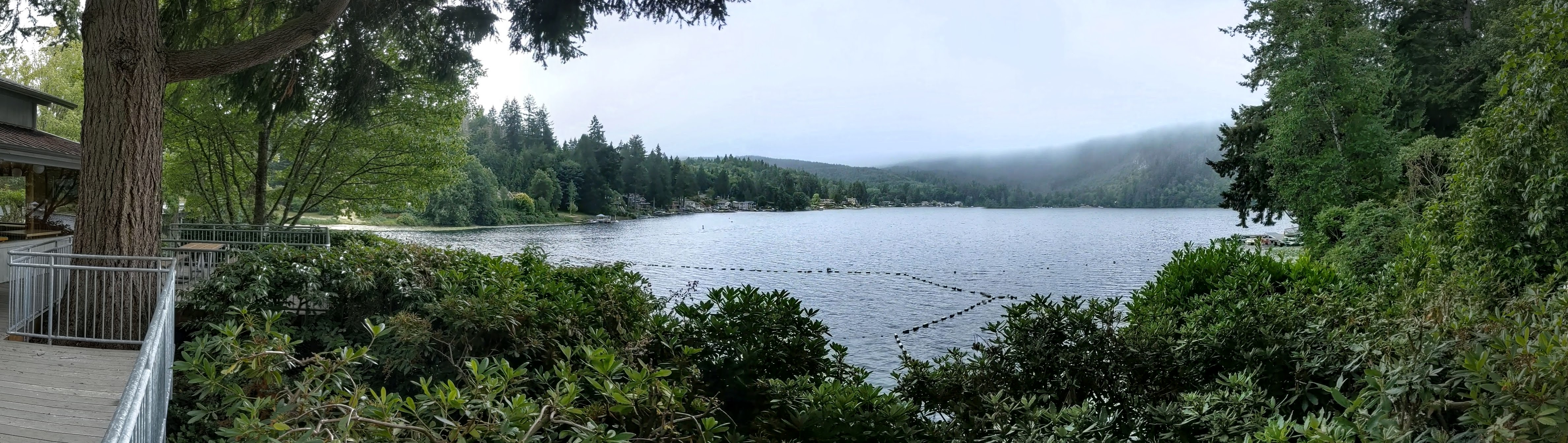
Lake Samish west part, panoramic view from Samish Day Lodge at Lake Samish County Park
