= I-5 Colonnade =

Public park in Seattle, Washington, U.S.

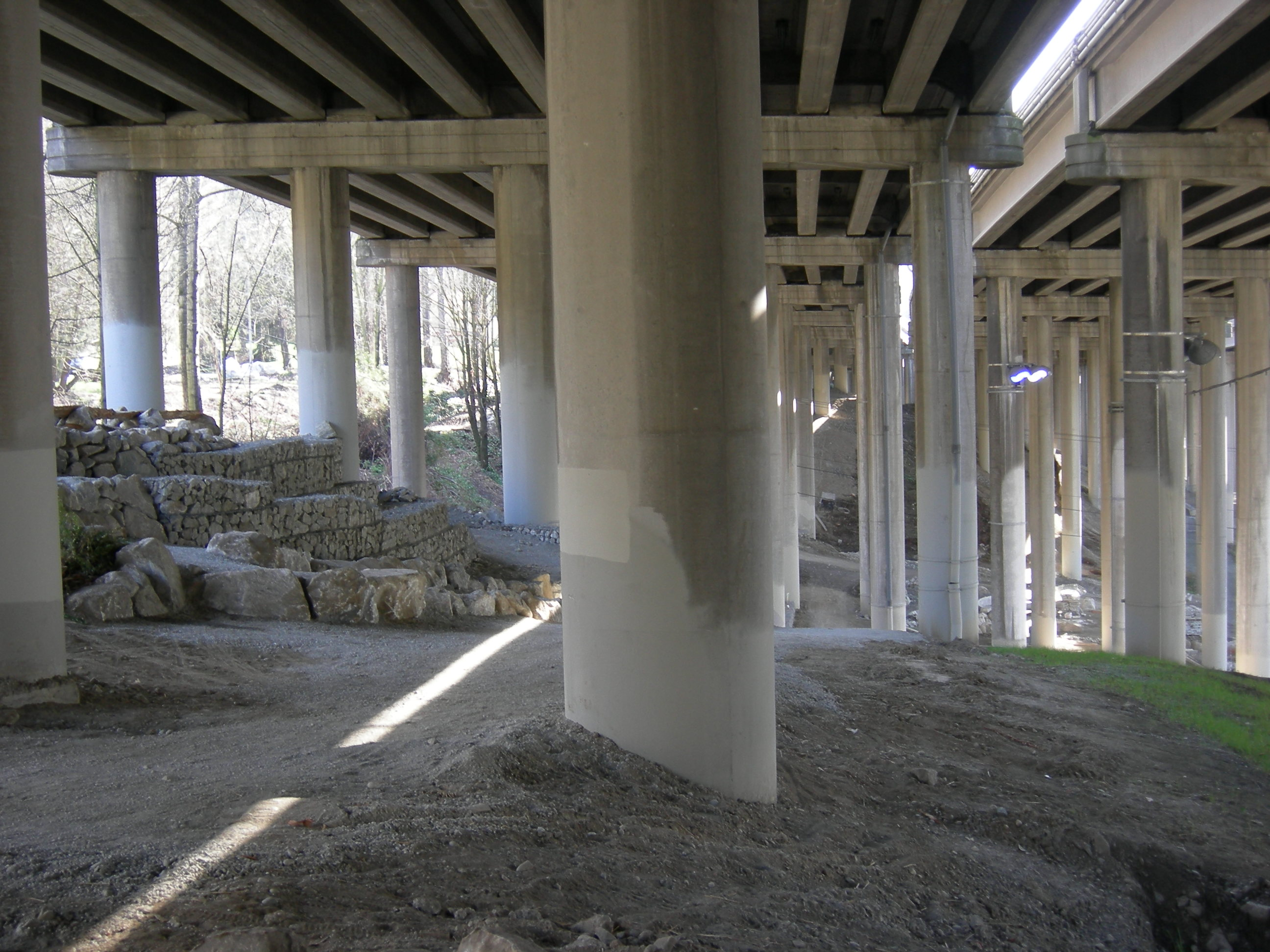
- Park terrain under the Interstate 5 bridges.
- Interactive map of I-5 Colonnade
- Type: Urban Park
- Location: Seattle, Washington
- Coordinates: 47°38′06″N 122°19′25″W
- Area: 7.5 acres (30,000 m^{2})
- Established: 2005; 21 years ago
- Operator: Seattle Parks and Recreation

I-5 Colonnade in Seattle, Washington, United States, is a 7.5-acre (30,000 m^{2}) city park underneath Interstate 5 connecting the Capitol Hill and Eastlake neighborhoods, which were divided by the freeway in the 1960s. It stretches south of E. Howe Street to E. Garfield Street between Franklin Avenue E. and Lakeview Boulevard E. It was created in 2005.

== Bike Park ==
The I-5 Colonnade Mountain Bike Skills Park is located on roughly 2 acres (8,100 m^{2}) of I-5 Colonnade's 7.5 total acres. The bike park's first trail, now named Limestone Loop, opened on Sept 8 2007, and Phase 2 with both easier and many more advanced trails opened Sept 13, 2008. The trails were constructed by the Evergreen Mountain Bike Alliance (then known as the Backcountry Bicycle Trails Club) and its volunteers; Phase 2 construction was funded by the Seattle Neighborhoods Matching Fund and private donations. Trails span a wide variety of riding styles; they include several learning areas for different skills and techniques, Tqalu Trail a dual interpretive/skills building trail, Fisher Line, a pump track, and an upper practice area near Lakeview Boulevard. More advanced trails include a hillside switchback loop, several jump lines featuring K-line and Nicks Kicks, Zeb's Grotto a trials riding area, an elevated structure section featuring Cyclone and The Octagon Of Death, a rock jumble descent named the Waterfall, and Downhill/Freeride lines including The Offramp, Holy Chute, and Pips Hips.

The I-5 Colonnade bike park has paved the way for other mountain bike facilities in the state of Washington and beyond. Using the available space under the I-5 freeway has been heralded as a highly innovative approach to bring mountain biking to the intercity environment. The park transformed the area from a drug infested encampment to a refuge for Outdoor recreation.

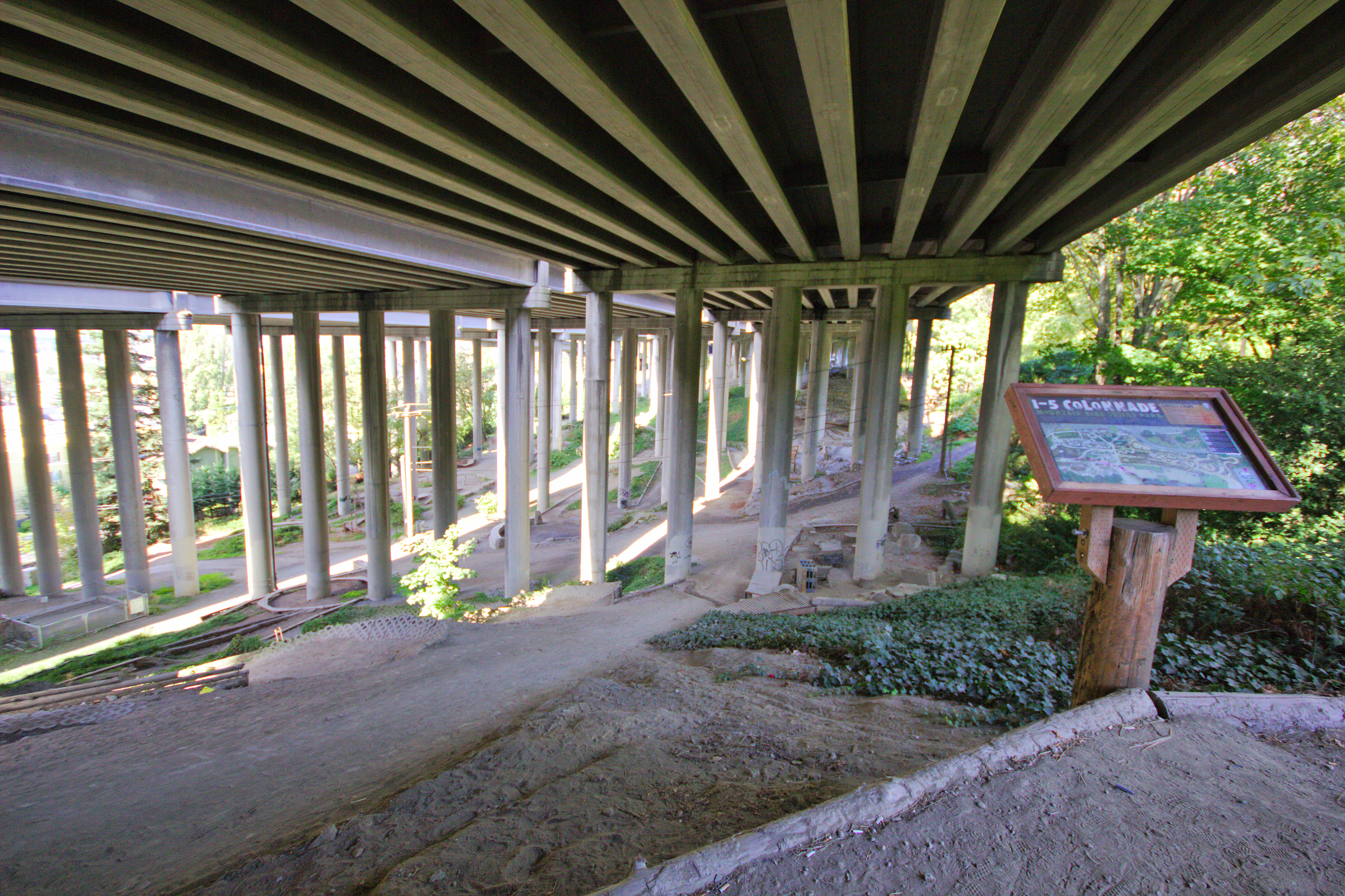
East side of the park with map
