= Tacoma Mall =

Shopping center in Tacoma, Washington, U.S.

Coordinates: 47°12′57″N 122°28′07″W

- South entrance
- Address: 4502 South Steele Street; Tacoma, Washington; 98409
- Opened: October 13, 1965; 61 years ago
- Manager: Simon Property Group
- Owner: Simon Property Group
- Num. of stores: 131
- Num. of anchor tenants: 5 (4 open, 1 demolished)
- Floor area: 1,319,607 sq ft (122,595.5 m^{2})
- Floors: 1 (2 in Dick's Sporting Goods, Nordstrom and former Sears, 3 in JCPenney, 4 in Macy's)
- Website: www.simon.com/mall/tacoma-mall

The Tacoma Mall is the largest shopping center in Tacoma, Washington, United States, and is owned and operated by the Simon Property Group. Anchor tenants include Dick's Sporting Goods, JCPenney (originally two levels, but added a third level in 1986), Macy's (originally The Bon Marché), and Nordstrom, with one vacant and demolished anchor last occupied by Sears, which opened in 1981. The mall opened on October 13, 1965.

== History ==
The mall opened on October 13, 1965. Another former anchor was Liberty House, which opened in 1974 (briefly Liberty House/Rhodes, with the Rhodes name later dropped, later Frederick & Nelson, then Mervyn's), which was demolished for the current location of Nordstrom, which relocated from an anchor that was originally Nordstrom Best, with the Best name-dropped in 1972, and expanded from 55,000 square feet to 134,000 square feet in 1983, in 2008. The former Nordstrom was divided into Sephora, Apple Store, and Forever 21 in 2010. Forever 21 relocated to a smaller location in 2016, and the former location became a Dick's Sporting Goods in 2017.

On May 31, 2018, it was announced that Sears would be closing as part of a plan to close 72 stores nationwide. The store closed on September 2, 2018.

Simon Property Group plans to redevelop portions of the mall to add more retail spaces that face outward in the former Sears space; the concept is similar to lifestyle centers and would include a through-street between several tenant buildings.

In December 2024, Simon had announced a multi million dollar renovation to the Tacoma Mall with new flooring, a new play structure, a new food court, new lighting, and refreshed mall entrances in order to keep the mall up to Simon’s current standards.

=== 2005 shooting ===
On November 20, 2005, 20-year-old Dominick Sergio Maldonado opened fire inside the mall, wounding six people. One of them was seriously injured. Maldonado took four people hostage but surrendered without further incident to SWAT. In 2007, Maldonado was sentenced to 163 years in prison.

== Anchors ==
- Macy's, opened August 1964 as The Bon Marche
- JCPenney, Opened October 1965 shortly after the Northgate Mall's JCPenney.
- Nordstrom, opened as Best's in 1965, relocated to its own building in 1983 and moved to former Mervyn's in 2008.
- Sears, opened in 1981, announced closure in May 2018, closed September 2, 2018, demolished April 7, 2019.
- Mervyn's, opened in 1993 in former Liberty House/Frederick & Nelson, closed in 2006.
