= Alger, Washington =

- CDP
- Location of Alger, Washington
- Coordinates: 48°37′20″N 122°12′25″W
- Country: United States
- State: Washington
- County: Skagit

Area
  - Total: 1.8 sq mi (4.7 km^{2})
  - Land: 1.8 sq mi (4.6 km^{2})
  - Water: 0 sq mi (0.0 km^{2})
- Elevation: 272 ft (83 m)

Population (2020)
  - Total: 507
  - Density: 290/sq mi (110/km^{2})
- Time zone: UTC−08:00 (Pacific (PST))
  - Summer (DST): UTC−07:00 (PDT)
- ZIP Code: 98229
- Area code: 360, 564
- FIPS code: 53-01255
- GNIS feature ID: 2407717

Alger is a census-designated place (CDP) in Skagit County, Washington, United States. The population was 507 at the 2020 census. It is included in the Mount Vernon–Anacortes, Washington Metropolitan Statistical Area.

Alger is located along Old Highway 99 North Road. It is near the midway point of the route between Seattle and Vancouver, 76 miles from the former and 66 miles from the latter. A former logging camp, Alger is now a working-class exurban community and home to the Skagit Speedway. The nearby Skagit Speedway has been operating for 50 years and attracting racers from all over the Northwest and West; Kasey Kahne raced there before becoming a NASCAR Sprint Cup driver. It is a 1/3 mile banked oval track built of silica and clay, and the faster classes of sprint cars achieve lap averages of almost 100 mph. Races are typically held on Saturday nights under floodlights, and camping is available for racers and spectators in the Speedway's grounds.

== History ==
Alger was first settled by Frederick G. Abbey in 1884.

== Geography ==
According to the United States Census Bureau, the CDP has a total area of 1.8 square miles (4.7 km^{2}), of which, 1.8 square miles (4.6 km^{2}) of it is land and 0.56% is water.

== Demographics ==
Historical population
Census	Pop.	Note	%±
2000	89		—
2010	403		352.8%
2020	507		25.8%
U.S. Decennial Census; 1970 1980 1990; 2000 2010

Alger first appeared as a census designated place in the 2000 U.S. census.

=== Racial and ethnic composition ===
Alger CDP, Washington – Racial and ethnic composition Note: the US Census treats Hispanic/Latino as an ethnic category. This table excludes Latinos from the racial categories and assigns them to a separate category. Hispanics/Latinos may be of any race.
Race / Ethnicity (NH = Non-Hispanic)	Pop 2000	Pop 2010	Pop 2020	% 2000	% 2010	% 2020
White alone (NH)	84	349	383	94.38%	86.60%	75.54%
Black or African American alone (NH)	0	0	4	0.00%	0.00%	0.79%
Native American or Alaska Native alone (NH)	0	8	8	0.00%	1.99%	1.58%
Asian alone (NH)	0	7	16	0.00%	1.74%	3.16%
Native Hawaiian or Pacific Islander alone (NH)	0	0	0	0.00%	0.00%	0.00%
Other race alone (NH)	0	0	3	0.00%	0.00%	0.59%
Mixed race or Multiracial (NH)	0	5	21	0.00%	1.24%	4.14%
Hispanic or Latino (any race)	5	34	72	5.62%	8.44%	14.20%
Total	89	403	507	100.00%	100.00%	100.00%

=== 2000 census ===
As of the census of 2000, there were 89 people, 35 households, and 24 families residing in the CDP. The population density was 49.7 people per square mile (19.2/km^{2}). There were 42 housing units at an average density of 23.5/sq mi (9.1/km^{2}). The racial makeup of the CDP was 94.38% White, 5.62% from other races. Hispanic or Latino of any race were 5.62% of the population.

There were 35 households, out of which 31.4% had children under the age of 18 living with them, 57.1% were married couples living together, 8.6% had a female householder with no husband present, and 28.6% were non-families. 25.7% of all households were made up of individuals, and 14.3% had someone living alone who was 65 years of age or older. The average household size was 2.54 and the average family size was 3.00.

In the CDP, the age distribution of the population shows 21.3% under the age of 18, 12.4% from 18 to 24, 24.7% from 25 to 44, 25.8% from 45 to 64, and 15.7% who were 65 years of age or older. The median age was 41 years. For every 100 females, there were 107.0 males. For every 100 females age 18 and over, there were 118.8 males.

The median income for a household in the CDP was $13,542, and the median income for a family was $34,125. Males had a median income of $37,614 versus $36,250 for females. The per capita income for the CDP was $18,180. There were 27.6% of families and 35.8% of the population living below the poverty line, including no under eighteens and 38.5% of those over 64.
