= Washington State Route 526 =

State highway in Snohomish County, Washington, US

State Route 526
- Boeing Freeway
- A map of Snohomish County with SR 526 highlighted in red

Route information
- Auxiliary route of I-5
- Maintained by WSDOT
- Length: 4.52 mi (7.27 km)
- Existed: 1964–present
- Tourist routes: Cascade Loop Scenic Byway

Major junctions
- West end: SR 525 in Mukilteo
- East end: I-5 / SR 99 / SR 527 in Everett

Location
- Country: United States
- State: Washington
- County: Snohomish

Highway system
- State highways in Washington; Interstate; US; State; Scenic; Pre-1964; 1964 renumbering; Former
← SR 525	→ SR 527

State Route 526 (SR 526), also known as the Boeing Freeway, is a state highway in Snohomish County, Washington, United States. The east–west highway travels 4.52 miles (7.27 km) and connects SR 525 in Mukilteo to Interstate 5 (I-5) in southern Everett. The highway serves the Boeing Everett Factory and Paine Field; it also serves as a main route to the city of Mukilteo and the state-run ferry to Whidbey Island.

SR 526 was established during the 1964 state highway renumbering as the successor to Secondary State Highway 1I (SSH 1I) between Mukilteo and Everett. Its original route followed a wagon road traveling along Possession Sound that opened in 1914; it was moved onto its current route in 1967 after Boeing announced its intention to build a factory in Everett for its 747 airliner.

== Route description ==
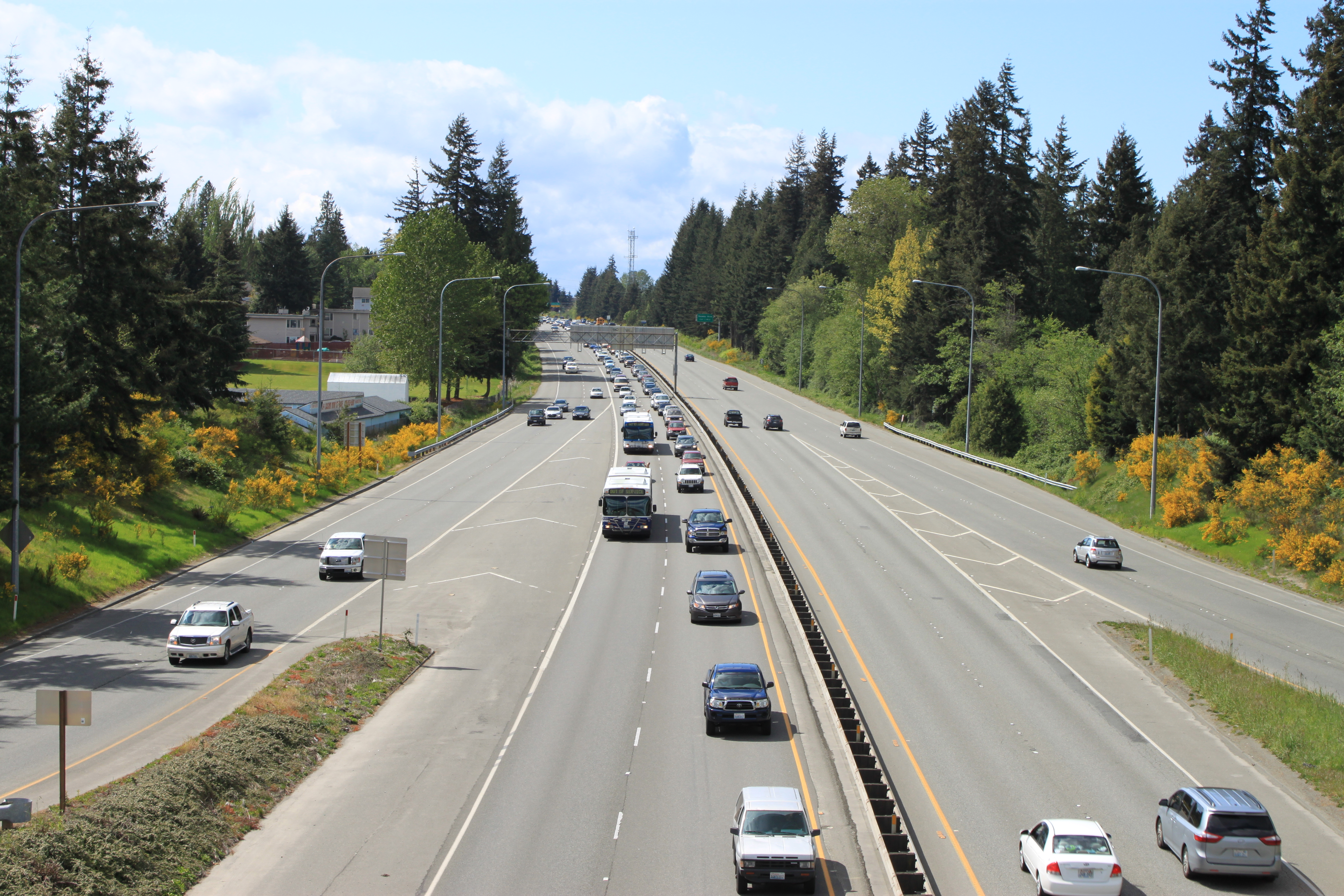
SR 526 westbound in Everett

SR 526 begins as 84th Street Southwest at a signalized intersection with SR 525, named the Mukilteo Speedway, at Nelsons Corner in Mukilteo. The highway travels east through a residential neighborhood, heading towards an intersection with Paine Field Boulevard, signed as SR 525 Spur, at the Future of Flight Aviation Center and Paine Field. SR 526 turns northeast as the four-lane continuation of Paine Field Boulevard, curving north around the north–south runway of Paine Field and south of Japanese Gulch, into the city of Everett. The highway becomes the controlled-access Boeing Freeway and passes under the Boeing Access Road, a taxiway that connects the Boeing Everett Factory to Paine Field. SR 526 continues east and intersects Airport Road in a diamond interchange and Seaway Boulevard in a semi-directional T interchange, the main access roads to Paine Field and the Boeing factory, respectively, before widening to six lanes as it approaches its eastern terminus, an interchange with I-5. The freeway travels through a diamond interchange with Evergreen Way, located east of a pedestrian bridge over SR 526 and south of Cascade High School, where traffic heading towards I-5 northbound on a left directional exit and traffic heading towards I-5 southbound splits into two lanes, a normal lane and a high-occupancy vehicle lane (HOV lane). SR 526 continues east, briefly paralleling the Interurban Trail, before the freeway travels towards I-5 on flyover ramps and the highway terminates at the northern terminus of SR 99 and the northern terminus of SR 527.

Every year, the Washington State Department of Transportation (WSDOT) conducts a series of surveys on its highways in the state to measure traffic volume. This is expressed in terms of annual average daily traffic (AADT), which is a measure of traffic volume for any average day of the year. In 2013, WSDOT calculated that the busiest section of SR 526 was its interchange with Evergreen Way, carrying 75,000 vehicles, while the least busiest section of the highway was its western terminus at SR 525, carrying 8,500 vehicles. SR 526 is designated as part of the National Highway System for its whole length, classifying it as important to the national economy, defense, and mobility. WSDOT designates the entire route of SR 526 as a Highway of Statewide Significance, which includes highways that connect major communities in the state of Washington.

== History ==
SR 526 was established during the 1964 state highway renumbering as the successor to SSH 1I between Mukilteo and Everett. The highways were preceded by the Mukilteo-Everett wagon road that was opened on August 14, 1914, traveling east along Possession Sound between Mukilteo and Everett, later renamed to Mukilteo Boulevard during the 1920s. The boulevard route had previously been surveyed in 1882 for a wagon road connecting Mukilteo to Lowell (now part of Everett) by the county government. SSH 1I was designated in 1937 along the route of Mukilteo Boulevard and a new highway connecting Mukilteo to U.S. Route 99 (US 99) in Lynnwood, traveling in a 10.63-mile (17.11 km) circular arc. SSH 1I was split into SR 525 from Lynnwood to Mukilteo and SR 526 from Mukilteo to Everett during the 1964 state highway renumbering. The eastern terminus of the former SR 526, an interchange with I-5 in Everett, was completed in February 1965 and later became the southern terminus of SR 529 until 1991. The interchange was later converted to a single-point urban interchange in 2007 as part of a WSDOT project to improve I-5 through Everett.

Planning for a new freeway to carry SR 526 was approved in 1967 during construction of the Boeing factory, which was expected to generate more traffic congestion. The route initially used Casino Road, which was a two-lane road between Nelsons Corner in Mukilteo and Beverly Park in Everett; the eastern terminus was located at its intersection with US 99. The road was plagued with severe congestion as it was the only major arterial serving the factory at the time; Boeing's selection of the factory site was contingent on the road's reconstruction into a four-lane highway. However, the federal Economic Development Administration denied Everett's request for a funding grant towards the highway, leading the state to fund the construction despite facing a budget shortfall itself. While the state waited for sufficient funding to commence the project, Boeing constructed a temporary four-lane highway across the factory and parallel to Casino Road in June 1967 to relieve congestion on the latter road; at the same time, the section of Casino Road between Nelsons Corner and the west end of the controlled-access highway section was expanded to four lanes.

Construction of the permanent four-lane, 3.5-mile (5.6 km) controlled-access highway section commenced shortly after Peter Kiewit Sons won the contract in May 1968. The first part of the section, spanning 2 miles (3.2 km) between 20th Avenue West (now Seaway Boulevard) and US 99 (now Evergreen Way), opened on April 23, 1969; the whole section was opened by the end of the year. The western end of Casino Road was truncated at Airport Road, which was extended from 100th Street Southwest to the highway in connecting it with Post Road (now SR 96) at its interchange with I-5; this allowed the excluded section of Casino Road to connect with the rest of the highway. A ramp directly connecting northbound I-5 with westbound SR 526 was subsequently opened on November 13, 1970.

When Boeing expanded their factory in the early 1990s to accommodate 777 production, the state of Washington required that Boeing pay for upgrades to the connection between SR 526 and I-5. These upgrades resulted in a direct connection being built in 1995 to connect SR 526 to northbound I-5, which previously required the use of a loop ramp on SR 527. Additional upgrades included a high-occupancy vehicle lane on southbound I-5, along with a corresponding queue ramp on SR 526, and the construction of sound walls along the freeway.

Until 2000, SR 526 and 84th St. in Mukilteo was in a continuous alignment. When Paine Field Boulevard (SR 525 Spur) was completed in 2000, the alignment was changed to make the SR 526 expressway and Paine Field Boulevard continuous. The new intersection with 84th Street facilitated access to a new Boeing museum, the Future of Flight Aviation Center & Boeing Tour, which opened in 2005.

There were proposals in the 1980s and 1990s to realign SR 525 such that it would intersect with SR 526 near the head of Japanese Gulch. The realignment was intended to facilitate a new ferry dock in Mukilteo and to avoid the population center of the city. While the plans for the new dock were finalized, no plans were presented for such a connection, aside from the construction of SR 525 Spur.

In response to the increased usage of SR 526, WSDOT considered a complete redesign of the route in 2017. However, after consulting with an advisory group composed of representatives from local city governments, transit agencies, and lobbying firms, WSDOT elected to make improvements to the section between Seaway Boulevard and the eastern terminus of the route. Such improvements include the construction of a new eastbound lane, the widening of the Seaway Boulevard eastbound on-ramp to the route, the addition of a ramp meter for the direct ramp to I-5 north, and the modification of the signal lights at the eastern terminus intersection with SR 99 and SR 527. The start of construction on the improvement project was slated for 2022, with work concluding in 2024. A different seismic retrofitting project involving the wrapping of steel "jackets" on the columns of bridges carrying SR 526 over Airport Road, Hardeson Road, and Casino Road, along with an on-ramp from Seaway Boulevard to eastbound SR 526, began in February 2023 and was completed that December; during preparations for the project, WSDOT contractor crews found excessive excrement on the girders and supports of two of the overpasses from roosting pigeons, requiring cleanup by a hazmat crew and the installation of gel discs underneath the overpasses to deter all birds from them.

== Exit list ==
The entire highway is in Snohomish County.

Location	mi	km	Destinations	Notes
Mukilteo	0.00	0.00	SR 525 (Mukilteo Speedway)	Continues as 84th Street
Mukilteo	0.40	0.64	SR 525 Spur south (Paine Field Boulevard) to SR 525 south / Future of Flight Aviation Center	
Everett	0.80	1.29	Boeing Receiving	At-grade intersection
Everett	West end of freeway			
Everett	1.45	2.33	Airport Road – Paine Field	
Everett	1.97	3.17	Seaway Boulevard	
Everett	3.54	5.70	Evergreen Way	
Everett	East end of freeway			
Everett	4.52	7.27	I-5 – Vancouver BC, Seattle	
Everett	4.52	7.27	SR 99 south / SR 527 south / Broadway – Bothell	At-grade intersection, continues as SR 527
1.000 mi = 1.609 km; 1.000 km = 0.621 mi
