= Wendy Sue Swanson =

American physician

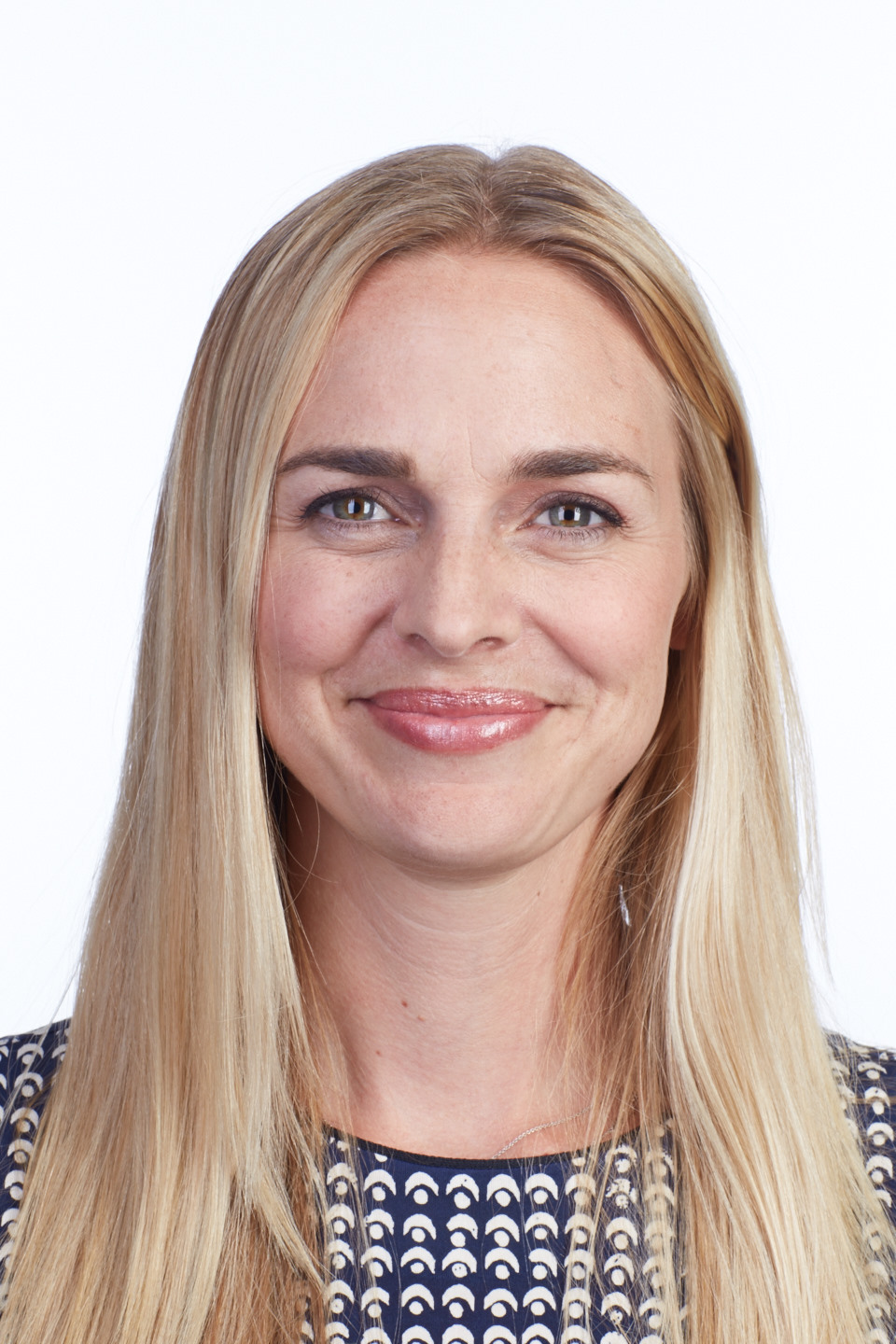
- Swanson in 2013
- Born: 1974 (age 51–52); Minnesota, United States
- Education: University of Pennsylvania School of Medicine
- Occupations: Pediatrician, writer, spokesperson
- Known for: Seattle Mama Doc blog
- Children: Two sons
- Awards: Centers for Disease Control and Prevention Childhood Immunization Champion 2012
- Swanson's voice recorded May 2015
- Website: www.seattlemamadoc.org

Wendy Sue Swanson (born 1974) is an American pediatrician, educator and author, known for her Seattle Mama Doc blog.

As a doctor and a mother, Swanson advocates the use of online tools, such as blogs, Facebook, Twitter and other social media sites, to strengthen communication between healthcare providers and patients. Swanson asserts that online technologies can assist patients and families in becoming stewards of their own health. Swanson has dedicated her career to helping physicians learn to use online tools more effectively in helping patients make informed decisions based in science. "While we don't have the capability just yet," Swanson states, "my goal is to prove that an empowered and informed patient reduces health care costs and improves outcomes."

== Education and training ==
Swanson was born and raised in Minnesota.

She attended Kenyon College in Gambier, Ohio, where, in 1996, she earned a Bachelor of Arts degree in psychology.

For two years, she taught bilingual science and math to middle school children in Oakland, California, with Teach for America. With this experience, Swanson developed an interest in working with youths.

She went on to earn a medical degree and Master of Bioethics (MBE) degrees from the University of Pennsylvania School of Medicine in Philadelphia, Pennsylvania. Swanson completed her pediatric residency training at Seattle Children's Hospital in Seattle, Washington. She completed her training in 2006.

Swanson began her medical career at the Everett Clinic in Mill Creek, Washington,.

In 2009, Swanson started the Seattle Mama Doc blog for Seattle Children's Hospital.

In January 2011, Swanson was named to the Mayo Clinic's Center for Social Media Advisory Board. The goal of the board is to help the health care community "improve care through the use of social media tools like Twitter, Facebook and YouTube.

Swanson is an official spokesperson for the American Academy of Pediatrics (AAP), a member of the Board of Advisors for Parents Magazine, and blogs for The Huffington Post. She has also appeared on The Today Show.

== Conferences and keynote speeches ==
With the popularity of Swanson's blog, as well as her activism in improving physician use of social media, came invitations to speak at health care conferences within the U.S., Canada and the Netherlands.

- Social Media Summit, hosted by the Mayo Clinic for Social Media, in Rochester, Minnesota (October 2011). Swanson's keynote session was entitled "How to encourage your physicians to engage and empower your audience through social media."
- Shot Smarts Conference in Idaho Falls, Boise and Coeur d'Alene, Idaho (April 2012). As part of National Infant Immunization Week, Swanson spoke at a series of conferences held for health care professionals, school personnel and childcare workers to provide them with the latest vaccination information and resources.
- Eighth Annual Pediatrics Bioethics Conference at the Treuman Katz Center for Pediatrics in Seattle, Washington (July 2012). Swanson, along with other conference speakers, led health care professionals in discussing issues such as childhood vaccinations, responses to parents who refuse to vaccinate, and professional boundaries when using social media (e.g., should a physician "friend" a patient or share personal information online).
- Accelerate from Age 0 to 110, sponsored by TedXNijmegen in Nijmegen, Netherlands (April 2013). Swanson's talk was titled "Why are patients not finding their doctors online?"
- Stanford Medicine X, Palo Alto, California (September 2014). Swanson presented a master class presentation: "Physician Online Identity".
- CDC National Immunization Conference in Atlanta, Georgia (September 2014). Swanson's keynote was titled "How 140 Characters is Changing Health Care."
- HealthAchieve 2014 in Toronto, Canada (November, 2014). The conference draws health care professionals from around the world to discuss new ideas in health care. Swanson's talk focused on changes in healthcare delivery brought about through the use of social media, new technologies, and increased patient involvement.
- Cerner Annual Flagship Conference in Kansas City, Missouri (November 2014). Swanson's keynote was titled "How 140 Characters is Changing Health Care".

== Seattle Mama Doc blog ==
On November 11, 2009, Seattle Children's Hospital became the first major children's hospital to host a pediatrician-authored blog. Swanson, now known as the "Seattle Mama Doc," wanted the blog to be an online science-based resource for parents. In her blog posts, Swanson offers general health and safety tips, discusses issues in the media like HPV, vaccinations, sudden infant death syndrome, car seats, and trends in breast-feeding, and shares her own experiences as a parent. "The abundance of online noise invokes fear in all of us when making decisions for our children," said Swanson. "At the end of the day, we as parents just want to do what is right."

Swanson is a proponent of vaccinations, which reduce the risk of contracting diseases like whooping cough, polio and measles. Her interest in social media stems, in part, from a desire to counteract misinformation reported in popular media about the safety of childhood immunizations and other health concerns promoted by people like Jenny McCarthy, Dr. Mehmet Oz and Alicia Stone. "I feel physicians are obligated to be online," Swanson told reporter Carol M. Rostrum. "If celebrities are going to be online, then we educated, practicing physicians had better be there, too."

Swanson uses Twitter, LinkedIn, Facebook, Doximity, and YouTube to educate and inform parents and her adolescent patients. Her goal is to create a non-threatening environment in which to talk about health findings and empower families. She refers patients to peer-reviewed medical information found on sites like the Centers for Disease Control and Prevention and the American Academy of Pediatrics.

In 2013, Seattle Mama Doc was named as one of Time's "Best Twitter Feeds of 2013".

In October 2019, Seattle Mama Doc came to an end as Swanson moved with her family to Wisconsin.

"I have all of these tools at my fingertips. I can use them to see where myths are being created, stated facts and allay fears. I can connect in a one-to-many format and engage in people's lives in the manner they choose. When they come to the office and have learned from the information, we can move onto more important discussions."

— Swanson, Beyond the Waiting Room

== Mama Doc Medicine ==
Swanson's book, Mama Doc Medicine: Finding Calm and Confidence in Parenting, Child Health, and Work-Life Balance, was published by the American Academy of Pediatrics in March 2014. The book is organized in four sections: Prevention, Social-Emotional Support, Immunizations, and Work-Life Balance/Mothering. Swanson offers tips and information on a variety of topics from car seats, sunblock, immunizations, fussy babies and tantrums, to emotional support and work-life balance. She also provides reputable online resources for readers wishing to seek further information on the topics covered in the book.

In April 2014, Swanson was a guest on Katie Couric's talk show to discuss her book and share parenting tips.

== Virtual Handshake ==
Swanson's first technological project to be put into practice, the Virtual Handshake, was developed by the innovation group, Digital Health. The group, led by Swanson, studies current social tools and media and then works to develop new tools for physicians and patients. With Virtual Handshake, patients preparing for a doctor's appointment can access curated health information (e.g., PDFs, videos, links and other content) in a HIPAA-compliant encrypted space.

== Personal life ==
Swanson resides in Wisconsin with her husband, also a physician, and two sons. She has two sons, aged 10 and 12.

== Awards ==
- Healthcare Internet Hall of Fame Innovative Individual Inductee in 2014
- Ranked one of TIME Magazine's Best Twitter Feeds of 2013
- The CDC Childhood Immunization Champion Award (2012), the first of its kind, for her work as a public health advocate, which the CDC considered innovative

== Books ==
- Swanson, Wendy Sue (2014). Mama Doc Medicine: Finding Calm and confidence in Parenting, Child Health, and Work-Life Balance. American Academy of Pediatrics. ISBN 978-1-581-10837-8.

== Selected articles ==
- Swanson, Wendy Sue (March 5, 2015). "Vaccines and The F Bomb". The Huffington Post.
- Swanson, Wendy Sue (December 29, 2014). "E-Cigarettes: One Dead in New York and 'Vape' Is the Word of the Year". The Huffington Post.
- "Why Boring Is Best: Un-Decorating Your Baby's Crib" (The Huffington Post, December 2014; updated February 2015)
- "Pot in Your Pantry? Marijuana Use in Toddlers and Teens" (The Huffington Post, October 2014; Updated December 2014)
- "Ouchless Flu in 2014–2015: Nasal Flu Spray Recommended for Young Children" (The Huffington Post, October 2014; updated December 2014)
- "LuluLemon's False Claim is a Slap in the Face" (The Huffington Post, July 2014; updated September 2014)
- "You Mamas Taking Iodine?" (The Huffington Post, June 2014; updated August, 2014)
- "What's Your Strategy for Keeping Your Kids Alive in the Car?" (The Huffington Post, May 2014; updated July 6, 2014)
- "How to Talk to Your Kids About Justin Bieber's Arrest" (The Huffington Post, January 2014; updated March 2014)
- "The Problem with Friday Night Tykes" (The Huffington Post, January 2014; updated March 2014)
- "2013–2014 Flu is Here" (The Huffington Post, January 2014; updated March 2014)
- "Left to Chance with the iPotty" (The Huffington Post, December 2013; updated February 10, 2014)
- "Smokeout" (The Huffington Post, November, 2013; updated January 2014)
- "PG-13 Movies: More Guns" (The Huffington Post, November 2013; updated January 2014)
- "Buying Breast Milk Online" (The Huffington Post, October 24, 2013; updated January 2014)
- "Consistency May Be the 'Secret Sauce'" (The Huffington Post, October 2013; updated January 2014)
- "Talking to a Canadian Cabbie Gave Me Insight on Healthcare" (The Huffington Post, October 3, 2013; updated January 2014)
- "An Annual Interview: 20 Questions" (The Huffington Post, September 2013; updated November 2013)
- "It's Time for Flu Shots" (The Huffington Post, September 2013; updated November 2013)
- "I Love Being a Working Mom" (The Huffington Post, April 2013; updated June 2013)
