= Mill Creek, Washington =

City in Washington, United States

Mill Creek
- City
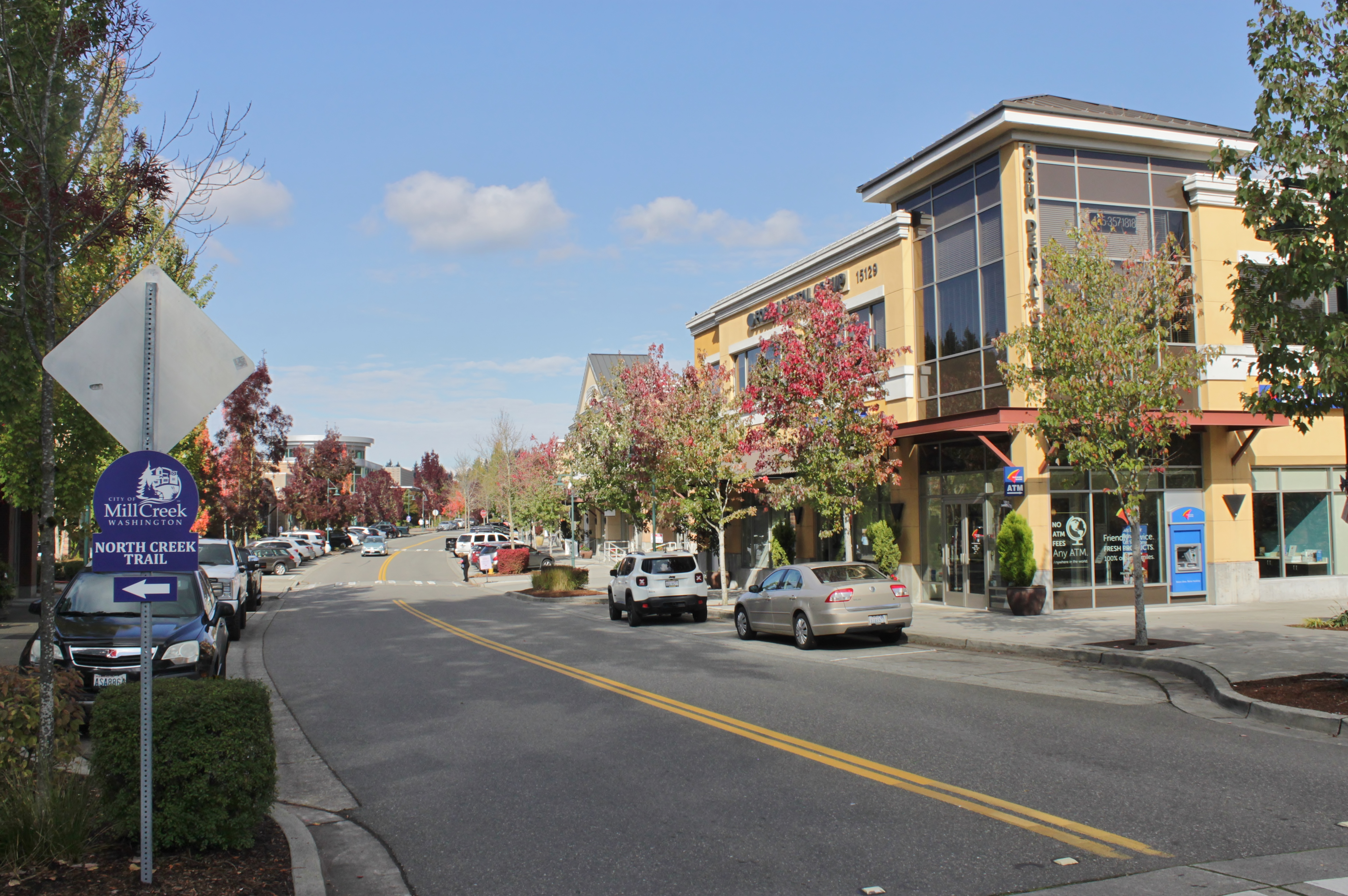
- Main Street in the Mill Creek Town Center

- Logo
- Interactive map of Mill Creek
- Coordinates: 47°51′42″N 122°12′16″W
- Country: United States
- State: Washington
- County: Snohomish
- Incorporated: September 30, 1983

Government
  - Type: Council–manager
  - Mayor: Brian Holtzclaw
  - Manager: Martin Yamamoto

Area
  - Total: 4.66 sq mi (12.06 km^{2})
  - Land: 4.64 sq mi (12.03 km^{2})
  - Water: 0.015 sq mi (0.04 km^{2})
- Elevation: 377 ft (115 m)

Population (2020)
  - Total: 20,926
  - Estimate (2024): 20,993
  - Density: 4,500.2/sq mi (1,737.55/km^{2})
- Time zone: UTC-8 (Pacific (PST))
  - Summer (DST): UTC-7 (PDT)
- ZIP codes: 98012, 98082
- Area code: 425
- FIPS code: 53-45865
- GNIS feature ID: 1534566
- Website: millcreekwa.gov

Mill Creek is a city in Snohomish County, Washington, United States. It is located south of Everett and northeast of Lynnwood, approximately 20 miles (32 km) northeast of Seattle. The city has a population of 20,926 as of the 2020 census. The city lies along State Route 527 and North Creek, a tributary of the Sammamish River, on the east side of Interstate 5.

The city is one of the highest-income suburbs in the Seattle metropolitan area and was originally a planned community conceived in the 1970s. The planned development was centered around a country club and golf course, with other development occurring nearby in later phases. It was incorporated as a city in 1983, shortly after the completion of the first phase of development, and underwent major population growth due to continued suburban development and annexation of nearby areas. The city's downtown area is centered around the Mill Creek Town Center, a mixed-use lifestyle center and retail complex that opened in 2004.

== History ==
=== Development ===
The Mill Creek area was originally settled in the early 20th century by various farming families, from whom several local placenames are now derived. After the construction of the Bothell–Everett Highway in 1913 as part of the Pacific Highway, two junctions at Murphy's Corner and Wintermute's Corner gained small stores and filling stations to serve visitors. In 1931, Doctor Manch N. Garhart acquired 800 acres (320 ha) in the area and used it to grow Gravenstein apples and Bartlett pears while also raising cattle. The Garhart property, named Lake Dell Farm for a small reservoir built by local families, was later sold in 1967 to real estate developers after the market for local lumber and fruits had declined.

The Garhart property, along with several neighboring farms, were optioned by various real estate developers in the 1960s and 1970s as a potential master planned community due to its proximity to the recently completed Interstate 5. It would be the first modern planned city in Washington state, following in the footsteps of earlier planned cities like Longview, built in 1918. The community, named "Olympus", was planned to include 3,300 acres (1,300 ha) in its first phase with 1,300 acres (530 ha) for homes, an industrial park, a shopping center, and a golf course. After a local recession in the early 1970s, the development project was sold in 1973 to Tokyu Land Development and designed by a subsidiary of the Obayashi Corporation named United Development. The development was renamed "Mill Creek", beating out the Chinook Jargon word "Klahanie", although there had never been a mill in the vicinity and a waterway of that name was not present in the area until the 2000 renaming of Smokehouse Creek.

Mill Creek's master plan was submitted to the county council in January 1974. A homeowners association was established in December 1974 with funding from United Development to manage the area's security patrol, street maintenance, and other tasks. The initial plan included consist of 4,600 homes, with eventual plans to house 12,000 people, a 260-acre (110 ha) park, and an 18-hole golf course. Construction began in early 1975 on the golf course and adjoining country club, while the first homes were under construction by the following year. The first set of homes were designed to resemble country residences, with large floorplans and prominent use of wood furnishings, and sold for an average of $65,000 (equivalent to $368,000 in 2025 dollars). Tokyu Land Development later re-used these home designs for the domestic market in Japan, where they were sold under the "Mill Creek" brand in the 1990s. The final phase of the original Mill Creek development, consisting of 33 condominiums, was completed in late 2003.

=== Incorporation and annexations ===
A majority of the first phase's 1,767 homes and condominiums were completed by early 1983, when an incorporation petition was submitted by residents after reaching the population threshold of 3,000 needed for cityhood. At the time, the homeowners association and county government had already provided much of the area's infrastructure and maintenance requirements, but local residents resisted attempts to raise property tax assessments. Mill Creek was officially incorporated as a city on September 30, 1983, ten days after a vote of residents passed, and encompassed 1.92 square miles (5.0 km^{2}). Mill Creek was the first new city to be incorporated in Snohomish County since Brier in 1965 and the newest in the state since Ocean Shores in 1970.

In the years following incorporation, Mill Creek reduced its property tax rates and formed its own police department, library, postal address, and land-use board. The city's telephone system was split between three long-distance calling areas by GTE until the state utilities and transportation commission approved a consolidated calling area for toll-free service. Sid Hanson, the chairman of the incorporation committee, was elected as the city's first mayor and served a single term until declining to run for re-election in 1987. The city government's offices moved four times by the end of the decade, between various leased buildings that all served as temporary city halls. A separate post office serving the city was promised at the time of incorporation, but was not opened until 1994.

The city attempted its first annexations in 1986, but an advisory vote of existing residents rejected one proposal and the city council deferred action on another. Mill Creek approved its first annexation, an 88-acre (36 ha) parcel southeast of the main development, in July 1987, while the nearby city of Everett began its own annexations of areas to the north of Mill Creek. In 1989, the city proposed a major annexation of 350 acres (140 ha), a 25 percent increase in size, to add undeveloped commercial parcels on the west side of the Bothell–Everett Highway. The western annexation was initially opposed by the county government, but was approved alongside four other annexations after Mill Creek agreed to share costs for road improvements to handle additional traffic demand.

Everett attempted to annex the entire Murphy's Corner area in the late 1980s, but was forced to split the neighborhood at 132nd Street with Mill Creek after a decision by the state court of appeals and additional arbitration by boundary review boards. The Henry M. Jackson High School was opened in 1994 and is located on the Mill Creek side of Murphy's Corner, which was annexed the following year. A private high school, Archbishop Murphy High School, was opened in 1999 on a 22-acre (8.9 ha) campus in northeastern Mill Creek. The 553-acre (224 ha) Thomas Lake area in the northeastern corner of the city, bordered to the north by 132nd Street and east by Seattle Hill Road, was annexed in 2005 and added 2,200 residents to the city's population. The annexations of other developed subdivisions, lacking the original development's upscale image, created a divide between residents on the issue of further growth. Residents in several potential annexation targets preferred to be left alone by Mill Creek, due to its "snobbish" reputation, which faded as new neighborhoods were absorbed into the city.

=== 21st century ===
In the late 1980s, Mill Creek drafted a comprehensive plan that would transform its newly annexed commercial area into a mixed-use downtown area to support the growing city. The 23-acre (9.3 ha) downtown development would include a large public park, shopping areas, recreational facilities, multi-use trails, and office buildings. After difficulty in finding a suitable developer, the Mill Creek Town Center began construction in 2001 and the first phase opened three years later. The second phase was completed in 2007, with 26 retail buildings, a medical clinic, condominiums, and a downtown plaza.

The Bothell–Everett Highway (now State Route 527) remained a two-lane rural highway through Mill Creek until the start of an expansion and improvement program in the 1990s. It was widened to four lanes with a center turn lane, and also gained bicycle lanes, sidewalks, and new landscaping features. The section through Mill Creek, from 164th Street to 132nd Street, was completed in 2006 and required the construction of retaining walls and detention ponds due to the limited space for the road. The project also included new bus stops that were later upgraded with the opening of the Swift Green Line bus rapid transit system in March 2019.

The city government began planning for a second urban village, to be located in newly annexed areas at the northeast edge of the city, in 2007. The retail and residential development, named the East Gateway, would have been located on 52 acres (21 ha) along 132nd Street, and was originally slated to be anchored by a Wal-Mart until the company scrapped plans after protests from local residents. The eastern half of the development began construction in 2012 and will encompass 210 apartments, 104 townhouses, office space, and retail. Development of the remaining western half was approved in 2019 and branded as "The Farm at Mill Creek", consisting of 354 apartments, retail space, workforce housing units, and office space. It was anchored by the first suburban Amazon Go in the state and a hotel. Plans for an urban neighborhood in the area between city hall and 164th Street Southeast, named the South Town Center, were approved by the city council in 2026. The plans call for a central park and up to 5,000 new housing units.

== Geography ==
The city of Mill Creek has a total area of 4.69 square miles (12.15 km^{2}) according to the U.S. Census Bureau. The city limits of Mill Creek are generally defined to the west by North Creek, to the north by 132nd Street Southeast (part of State Route 96) and Everett, to the east by Seattle Hill Road and 35th Avenue Southeast, and to the south by 163rd Street Southeast and North Creek County Park. The city is surrounded by a larger urban growth area that encompasses unincorporated land, including the communities of Martha Lake and Silver Firs, with a population of 68,746 people in 2020. The urban growth area extends west to Interstate 5, including an overlapping claim with Lynnwood and south to 196th Street Southeast at the north end of the Bothell claim.

Several creeks flow through the city, including North Creek (a tributary of the Sammamish River), Penny Creek, and Nickel Creek. A minor stream known as Smokehouse Creek was renamed to Mill Creek in 2001, retroactively giving the city a geographic namesake. The center of Mill Creek lies along State Route 527, between two protected wetlands along North Creek and Penny Creek. The original plat of Mill Creek, located east of State Route 527, consists of 21 neighborhood subdivisions that are named for various types of trees.

== Economy ==
As of 2015, Mill Creek has an estimated workforce population of 10,227 people and an unemployment rate of 2.2 percent. The largest industry of employment for Mill Creek residents is in educational services and health care, at over 21 percent, followed by manufacturing (16%), professional services (15%), and retail trade (12%). Approximately 3 percent of the city's workers have jobs located within city limits, with the majority commuting to employers in other cities, with an average commute time of 31 minutes. Over 21 percent of workers commute to Seattle, the largest destination, followed by Everett (16%), Bellevue (8%), and Bothell (5%).

The Puget Sound Regional Council estimated that the city had a total of 6,262 jobs as of 2018, with the largest sectors being professional services and construction. Mill Creek's largest employers include Albertsons, Central Market, The Everett Clinic, Lowe's, Safeway, and the Mill Creek County Club. The city was formerly the headquarters of video games developer Handheld Games and food manufacturer Dream Dinners.

== Demographics ==
Historical population
Census	Pop.	Note	%±
1990	7,172		—
2000	11,525		60.7%
2010	18,244		58.3%
2020	20,926		14.7%
2024 (est.)	20,993		0.3%
U.S. Decennial Census

Mill Creek is the eighth largest city in Snohomish County with 20,926 people counted in the 2020 U.S. census. It is one of the most affluent suburbs of Seattle and has a median household income of $86,965 and a per capita income of $42,858. Approximately 4.1 percent of families and 6.4 percent of the overall population were below the poverty line, including 14.9 percent of those under the age of 18 and 2.5 percent aged 65 or older. Mill Creek was ranked 36th on a 2013 Money magazine list of best places to live, based on its quality of life, housing affordability, and school system.

The city's population has steadily grown from 3,549 at the time of its incorporation in 1983 to over 19,000 in 2016, due to several annexations. From 1983 to 1990, it increased by 298 percent to 7,172 residents.

=== 2020 census ===
As of the 2020 census, there were 20,926 people and 8,703 households living in Mill Creek, which had a population density of 4,506.0 inhabitants per square mile (1,739.8/km^{2}). There were 9,068 total housing units, of which 96.0% were occupied and 4.0% were vacant or for occasional use. The racial makeup of the city was 63.1% White, 0.4% Native American and Alaskan Native, 3.0% Black or African American, 20.0% Asian, and 0.4% Native Hawaiian and Pacific Islander. Residents who listed another race were 3.1% of the population and those who identified as more than one race were 9.9% of the population. Hispanic or Latino residents of any race were 8.0% of the population.

Of the 8,703 households in Mill Creek, 53.1% were married couples living together and 6.2% were cohabitating but unmarried. Households with a male householder with no spouse or partner were 15.7% of the population, while households with a female householder with no spouse or partner were 25.0% of the population. Out of all households, 29.6% had children under the age of 18 living with them and 32.0% had residents who were 65 years of age or older. There were 8,703 occupied housing units in Mill Creek, of which 58.6% were owner-occupied and 41.4% were occupied by renters.

The median age in the city was 41.1 years old for all sexes, 39.7 years old for males, and 42.8 years old for females. Of the total population, 22.9% of residents were under the age of 19; 25.7% were between the ages of 20 and 39; 32.6% were between the ages of 40 and 64; and 18.9% were 65 years of age or older. The gender makeup of the city was 48.0% male and 52.0% female.

=== 2010 census ===
As of the 2010 census, there were 18,244 people, 7,551 households, and 4,921 families residing in the city. The population density was 3,906.6 inhabitants per square mile (1,508.3/km^{2}). There were 7,923 housing units at an average density of 1,696.6 per square mile (655.1/km^{2}). The racial makeup of the city was 74.2% White, 2.2% African American, 0.5% Native American, 16.7% Asian, 0.4% Pacific Islander, 1.6% from other races, and 4.4% from two or more races. Hispanic or Latino of any race were 5.6% of the population.

There were 7,551 households, of which 31.5% had children under the age of 18 living with them, 53.7% were married couples living together, 8.2% had a female householder with no husband present, 3.2% had a male householder with no wife present, and 34.8% were non-families. Of all Mill Creek households, 27.4% were made up of individuals, and 9.3% had someone living alone who was 65 years of age or older. The average household size was 2.42 and the average family size was 2.99.

The median age in the city was 38.9 years, with 23.3% of residents were under the age of 18; 8.3% were between the ages of 18 and 24; 27.4% were from 25 to 44; 28.6% were from 45 to 64; and 12.5% were 65 years of age or older. The gender makeup of the city was 48.6% male and 51.4% female.

== Government and politics ==
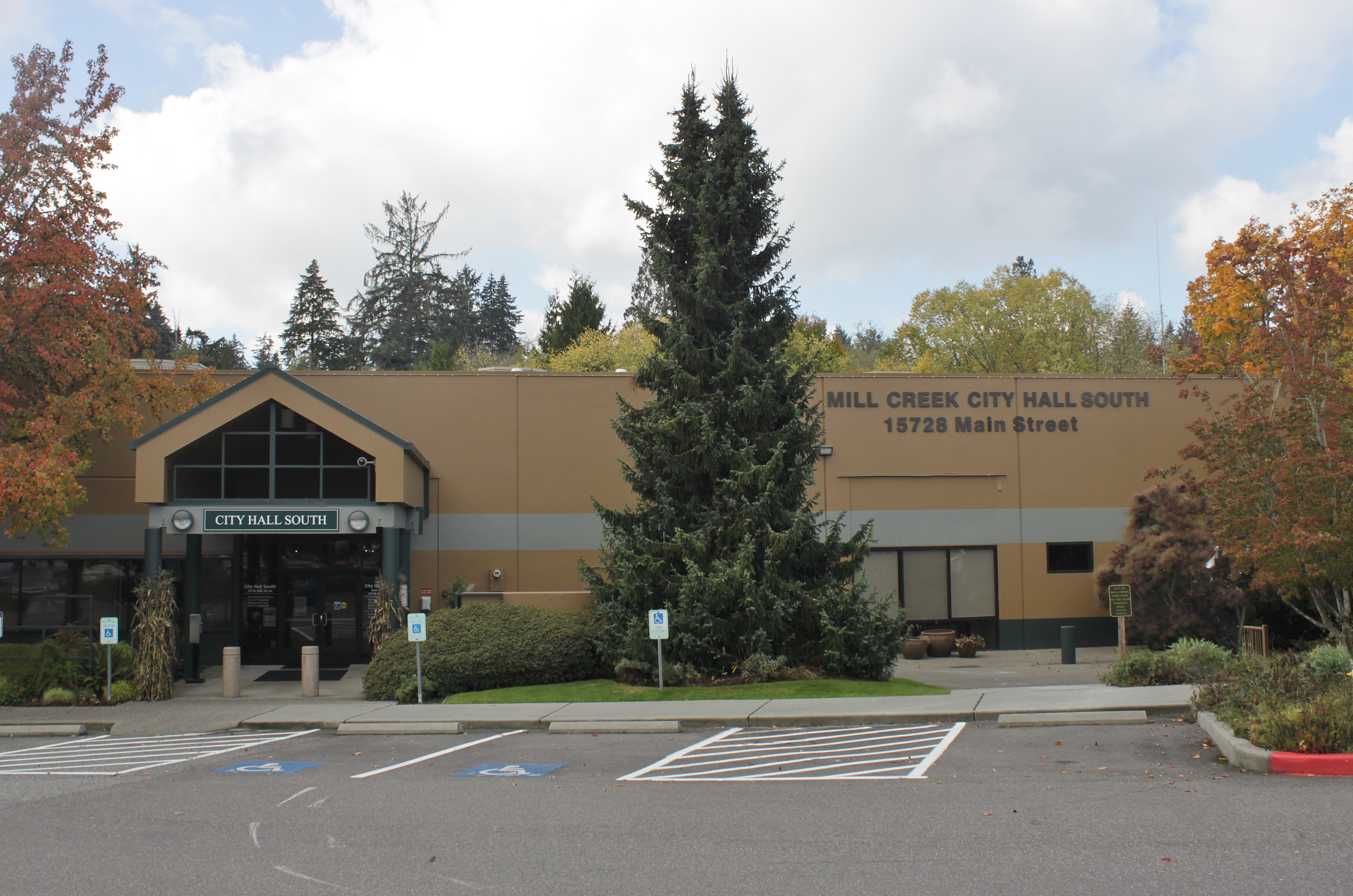
Mill Creek's city hall

Mill Creek is a non-charter code city with a council–manager government. The city council is composed of seven members elected in non-partisan, at-large elections to four-year terms. The councilmembers elect a ceremonial mayor and mayor pro tem from its members and appoint a city manager to execute its legislative policies. Councilmember Brian Holtzclaw has been the city's mayor since 2020. The city manager is Martin Yamamoto, who was appointed in 2022.

The city government has approximately 65 employees and a biennial appropriations budget of $59 million. Mill Creek provides civil services through its departments, including emergency services, parks and recreation, city planning, and public works. Several services are also contracted out to regional agencies and private companies, including water distribution, electricity, and fire protection. The city hall is located at the Huntron Building, which was acquired by the city government in 2008 and is located adjacent to the former city office building.

At the federal level, Mill Creek is part of the 1st congressional district, represented by Democrat Suzan DelBene since 2012. The district encompasses parts of Snohomish and King counties between Arlington and Bellevue that generally lie east of Interstate 5. At the state level, the city is part of the 44th legislative district alongside Snohomish. Mill Creek is also part of the Snohomish County Council's 4th district, which includes northern Bothell, Brier, and Mountlake Terrace.

== Culture ==
=== Events ===
Mill Creek's annual 5K run, the "Run of the Mill", was first organized in the 1980s and has since been held in July. The city's chamber of commerce also has an annual festival in July, while the town center has weekly concerts during the summertime. Mill Creek hosts a twice-annual community garage sale in May and October that was permitted by the covenants of the original development. The event, one of the largest of its kind in the county, brings an influx of outside traffic and is also coordinated with charity donations. The city also hosts annual parades on Memorial Day and Veterans Day. Mill Creek's farmers market runs from June to August and is located in the city hall parking lot.

=== Parks and recreation ===
Mill Creek has ten parks and two other recreational facilities maintained by the city government and located within city limits, comprising a total of 43 acres (17 ha). The city's ten neighborhood parks include playgrounds, sports facilities, and picnic tables; they range in size from the 1.2-acre (0.49 ha) Library Park to the 19.75-acre (7.99 ha) Nickel Creek Park. The Mill Creek Sports Park is a 4.8-acre (1.9 ha) park with a multi-purpose field for baseball, softball, and youth soccer, along with stands and a skate park.

The county government has several parks and recreational facilities near Mill Creek, including McCollum Park on State Route 96, Martha Lake Park to the west of the city, and North Creek Park at the south end of the city. McCollum Park and North Creek Park are connected to Mill Creek by a north–south multi-use pathway, the North Creek Trail, which continues south to Bothell. Mill Creek and the county also share joint ownership of Tambark Creek Park, located southeast of the city.

The golf course at the center of the original Mill Creek subdivision is owned by the members of the private country club, who purchased the facility for $5.2 million in 2007. The golf course is 300 yards (270 m) short of the required length to host a professional men's tournament. Mill Creek also has a private indoor sports arena that opened in 2017, encompassing 98,500 square feet (9,150 m^{2}) with three soccer fields, a bowling alley, and a laser tag arena.

=== Media ===
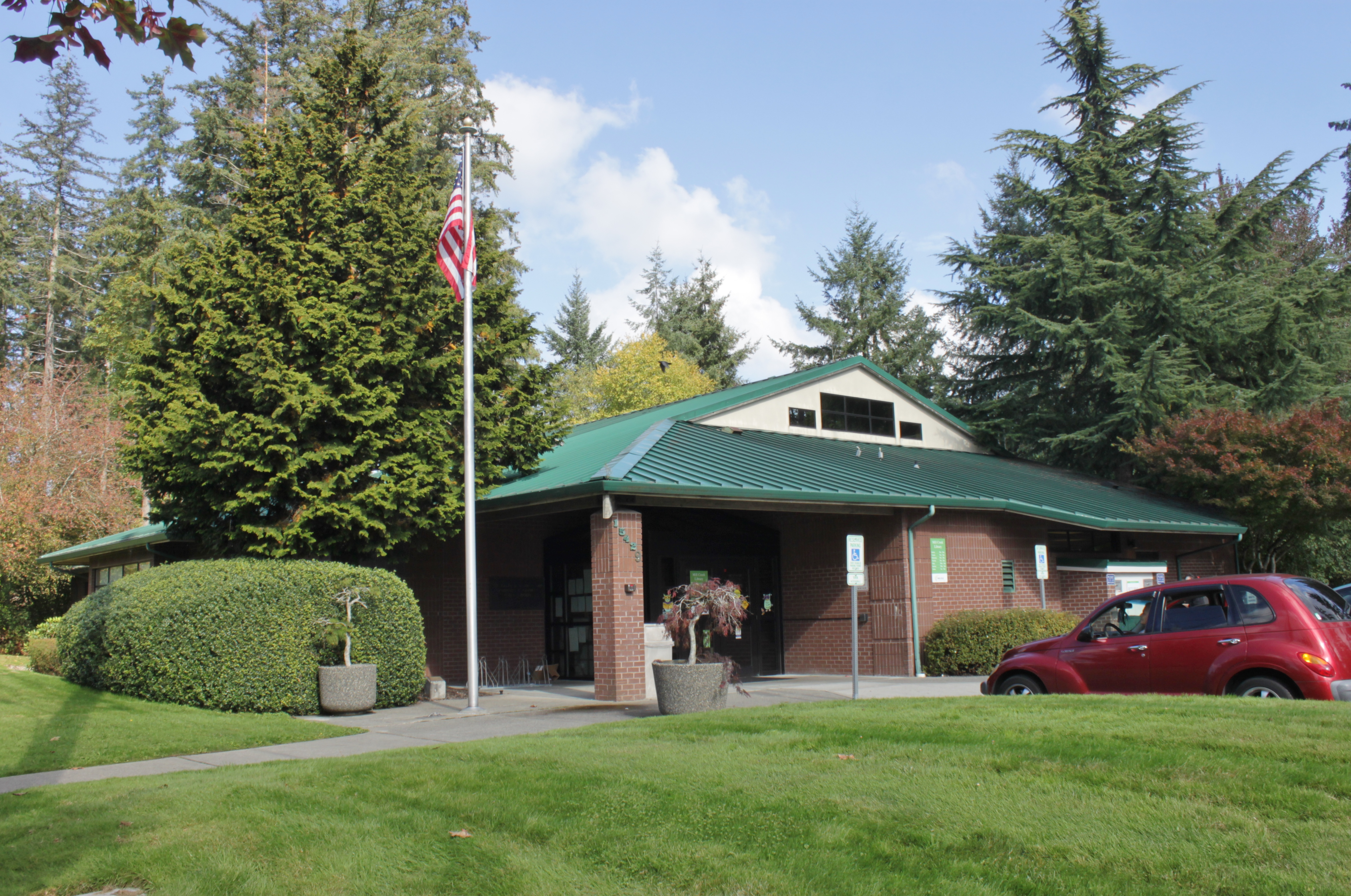
The Mill Creek library, operated by Sno-Isle Libraries

Mill Creek is served by several community publications, including the twice-monthly Mill Creek Beacon, the weekly News of Mill Creek, and the quarterly Mill Creek Living magazine. The Beacon was founded in 2014 and is owned by Beacon Publishing, which also operates weekly newspapers in Edmonds and Mukilteo. The Mill Creek View is a biweekly newspaper founded by Fred Fillbrook that has served the area since January 1991. A regional weekly newspaper, The Enterprise, formerly published a Mill Creek edition until a consolidation in 2009.

The city's public library was constructed in 1987 and expanded several times by Sno-Isle Libraries, its operator. Due to overcrowding at the current building, the city government considered a proposal to build a new library atop a Target store in the East Gateway urban village, but the plan fell through. The Mill Creek branch has 15,000 monthly visitors and the highest hold and pickup rate in the Sno-Isle Libraries system. The building was renovated in 2024 to improve its HVAC systems to serve as a cooling center during heat waves.

=== Notable people ===
- John E. Corbally, academic administrator and philanthropist
- Mark Harmsworth, state legislator
- Jerry Jensen, American football player and coach
- Ivan Koumaev, dancer
- Brent Lillibridge, baseball player
- John Lovick, state and county legislator
- August P. Mardesich, state legislator
- Brett McClure, Olympic gymnast
- Jared Mead, state representative
- Ramsey Nijem, mixed martial artist
- Jordan Schweitzer, soccer player
- Travis Snider, baseball player
- Paul Soloway, world bridge champion
- Wendy Sue Swanson, pediatrician and author
- Daniel Te'o-Nesheim, American football player

== Education ==
Public education in Mill Creek is provided by Everett Public Schools, which serves the adjacent city of Everett and several unincorporated neighborhoods. The school district covers 52 square miles (130 km^{2}) and has a total enrollment of more than 20,200 students. Mill Creek and its surrounding urban growth area is home to seven of the school district's 32 schools: Henry M. Jackson High School, Heatherwood Middle School, Gateway Middle School, and four elementary schools. The area also has several private schools, including Archbishop Murphy High School and Cedar Park Christian School. The nearest post-secondary institution is University of Washington Bothell, which draws students from southern Snohomish County.

== Infrastructure ==
=== Transportation ===
Mill Creek lies east of Interstate 5, the main north–south freeway through the Seattle metropolitan area with connections to Downtown Seattle and Everett. The city is bisected from north to south by State Route 527 (the Bothell–Everett Highway), which continues to Bothell. The two highways are connected by a pair of east–west streets, 164th Street and 128th Street (State Route 96), which continue further east into the residential neighborhoods of Mill Creek and towards State Route 9.

The city's public transportation is provided by Community Transit, which also serves most of the county with local and commuter bus routes. The county's second bus rapid transit route, the Swift Green Line, travels along State Route 527 and has several stops in Mill Creek, connecting the city to Paine Field and northern Bothell. A third bus rapid transit route, the Orange Line, opened in 2024 to connect Mill Creek to Link light rail at Lynnwood City Center station. Other local routes connect Mill Creek to Everett, Lynnwood, Silver Firs, and Snohomish. During rush hours, an express route connects Silver Firs and the 132nd Street corridor to Lynnwood City Center station. The Ash Way Park and Ride is located west of the Mill Creek Town Center and has additional Community Transit and Sound Transit Express routes. A Link light rail extension to Everett is planned to open in 2036 with stations at Ash Way and Mariner Park and Ride near Mill Creek.

A private airfield, Martha Lake Airport, operated west of modern-day Mill Creek from 1953 to 1998. It has since been converted into a county park, after the owners rejected a proposal to develop it into a housing subdivision. The nearest commercial airport is Paine Field, located 3 miles (4.8 km) northwest in Everett.

=== Utilities ===
Electric power in Mill Creek is provided by the Snohomish County Public Utility District (PUD), a consumer-owned public utility that serves all of Snohomish County. Puget Sound Energy provides natural gas service to the city's residents and businesses. The city government has a contract with Waste Management for curbside garbage, recycling, and yard waste collection and disposal.

The city's tap water and sewage systems are split between the Alderwood Water and Wastewater District and the Silver Lake Water and Sewer District, two independent municipal corporations. Both water districts use the Spada Lake reservoir, the main source of water for Snohomish County, and send wastewater to the Brightwater plant in Maltby and a facility in Everett.

=== Health care ===
Mill Creek is located near an urgent care center operated by Swedish Medical Center, which opened in 2011 and has an emergency room and other services. The Everett Clinic opened a 6,400-square-foot (590 m^{2}) facility in December 2016, offering walk-in and community services. An urgent care center operated by EvergreenHealth opened in 2018 with an on-site laboratory and nine exam rooms. Seattle Children's Hospital also operated a children's health clinic in Mill Creek until 2018, when it was replaced by a countywide facility adjacent to Everett's Providence Regional Medical Center.
