= Super Suppers =

Super Suppers was a US food preparation franchise operation based in Fort Worth, Texas. It specialized in providing space for families to prepare meals ahead of time for freezing and cooking at home. Once at 165 stores, the franchise ceased operations in 2011; currently six independently owned stores exist and are entitled to use the Super Suppers name and visual branding.

The concept of Super Suppers was to give busy families the opportunity to prepare home-cooked meals ahead of time. Each month a twelve-item menu would be made available throughout the chain. Clients would sign up for a session to prepare these meals, with recipes and all required ingredients provided. The standard session provided all twelve meals from that month's menu for around US$200. Each meal served six, and the firm's official website suggested a typical cost of US$3 to $3.50 per serving.

The Web site further described its founder, Judie Byrd, as having "created Super Suppers to meet the demanding needs of busy parents who want to create quality family time around the dinner table - but don't have the extra time and energy to pull it off." Byrd has authored several family-oriented cookbooks.

Stores also offered alternatives including grab-and-go of pre-assembled meal preparations, call-ahead-curbside pickup of store-assembled meal preps, and a fundraising-sales program.

A Super Suppers franchise in Cumming, Georgia, was profiled by the Food Network show Recipe for Success.

The franchise enjoyed early success, but suffered from a number of problems attributed to growing pains, amateur management and nepotism. Most corporate leaders were members of Byrd's family, and did not have appropriate training or experience outside the fledgling Super Suppers business. In addition, while the recipes were touted to be "chef created and tested," they often did not work once out in the field, and individual stores had to modify recipes, assembly instructions and cooking directions. The company also underestimated high food costs to support the retail pricing structure and quality required in order to meet industry standards and customer expectations. Perhaps the biggest problem for the franchise came when the corporate leaders decided to change website providers; the business, which was Internet-based, found itself without any web presence for several weeks while the web provider tried to get the system back online. It was later discovered that the new web provider had no experience in creating the type of e-commerce website required by the business, and that the former developer had disappeared. Despite these setbacks, the company continued to sell franchises and try to support existing stores with the staff they had.

Eventually, new store sales ground to a halt and a growing number of existing stores closed under a burden of high operating expenses, high food costs, increased competition and lack of business experience and training. Super Suppers ceased its corporate operations in 2011; the remaining open stores were allowed to continue to use the Super Suppers branding and visual identity. Currently, none of the open stores allow customers to make their own meals, but instead either custom-make orders themselves for pickup or delivery, or have an available supply of "grab-n-go" meals ready to take and bake.

== Store Closings ==
A Forbes Magazine article dated March 8, 2008, describing Super Suppers as the second-largest franchisor in the meal assembly franchise business with 165 units, traced the industry's rapid expansion followed by a precipitous rate of store closings ("...large chains (with more than 100 stores) have shuttered 11% of their stores...") and accompanying franchisee disappointment. The store in Erie closed in 2019.

== See also ==
- Dinners Ready, another meal assembly kitchen with locations throughout the United States.
- Dream Dinners, the originator of the meal assembly franchise concept.
