= Evergreen Middle School =

Evergreen Middle School may refer to the following schools:

- A school in the Everett School District in Washington state
- A school in the Hillsboro School District in Oregon
- A school in Jefferson County Public Schools
