= Everett Public Schools (Washington) =

Public school system in Everett, Washington, U.S.

Address
- 3900 Broadway Everett, Washington, 98201; United States
- Coordinates: 47.9651°N 122.2019°W

District information
- Type: Public
- Grades: Pre-K-12
- Superintendent: Dr. Ian B. Saltzman
- Governing agency: Washington State Office of Superintendent of Public Instruction
- Schools: 27

Students and staff
- Students: 20,727 (2025-26)
- Teachers: 1,207 (2025-26)
- Athletic conference: WIAA

Other information
- Website: www.everettsd.org

Everett Public Schools, officially Everett School District No. 2, is the main public school district for the city of Everett, Washington. In addition to covering most of Everett, the district also serves the city of Mill Creek along with some unincorporated areas of Snohomish County. The district has twenty-seven schools and has an enrollment of 20,727 students for the 2025-26 school year with a budget of $437.7 million (2025-26). The superintendent is Dr. Ian B. Saltzman.

== Boundary ==
The school district boundaries include most of Everett and all of Mill Creek. It also includes portions of unincorporated Snohomish County, such as the areas of Eastmont, Martha Lake, Mill Creek East, and Silver Firs.

== Schools ==
=== High schools ===
- Cascade High School
- Everett High School
- Henry M. Jackson High School
- Sequoia High School
- EPS Online High School

=== Middle schools ===
- Eisenhower Middle School
- Evergreen Middle School
- Gateway Middle School
- Heatherwood Middle School
- North Middle School

=== Elementary schools ===
- Cedar Wood Elementary School
- Emerson Elementary School
- Forest View Elementary School
- Garfield Elementary School
- Hawthorne Elementary School
- Jackson Elementary School
- James Monroe Elementary School
- Jefferson Elementary School
- Lowell Elementary School
- Madison Elementary School
- Mill Creek Elementary School
- Penny Creek Elementary School
- Silver Firs Elementary School
- Silver Lake Elementary School
- Tambark Creek Elementary School
- View Ridge Elementary School
- Whittier Elementary School
- Woodside Elementary School

=== Home School Parent Partnership ===
- Port Gardner
