= Dream Dinners =

American meal assembly store chain

- Company type: Private
- Industry: Meal Assembly
- Founded: March 2002; 23 years ago in Mill Creek, Washington, United States
- Founder: Stephanie Allen, Tina Kuna
- Headquarters: Snohomish, Washington, US
- Area served: US
- Website: dreamdinners.com

Dream Dinners is a US food preparation franchise operation based in Snohomish, Washington. It specializes in providing space to prepare meals ahead of time for freezing and cooking at home. There are several locations in 30 states. The company was founded by Stephanie Allen and Tina Kuna and was the first in the category of "Meal Assembly" franchises.

== Business concept ==
The concept of Dream Dinners is to give families the opportunity to prepare cooked meals in advance themselves, rather than buy ready-prepared meals. Each month a different seventeen-item menu is made available throughout the chain. The meals are purchased by servings, with a minimum order of 36 servings. First time customers can order 18 servings or 9 servings, depending on what is available at the store. A medium size meal is 3 servings while a large size meal is 6 servings. Customers are offered either public or private sessions to prepare these meals, and the store provides recipes and all the ingredients. Regular sessions provide all seventeen meals from that month's menu, while first time customers have a reduced number of choices. The firm's official website suggests a cost of "approximately $240, or under $6.75 per serving" for 12 regular or 6 large meals.

Some meals are complete (include side dishes), while others are not (need a salad or other vegetable side - for an additional fee). The more servings a customer orders in a single session, the lower the per-serving cost. Individual franchise locations may offer additional promotions or further discounts. Stores further offer a brochure describing a "self catering" service for parties. The company also supplies meal kits that are delivered to customers so they can make the meals at home.

== Media coverage ==
Dream Dinners has been featured in the O, The Oprah Magazine, The View, profiled by the Food Network show Recipe for Success and Good Morning America.

Forbes magazine profiled Dream Dinners and other franchise businesses in the meal assembly category in a May issue. The article, in May 2008, described the segment's rapid expansion followed by a precipitous rate of closings of the businesses, and detailed litigation between Dream Dinners and a group of franchisees alleging the firm misrepresented the potential value of the franchises, and improper disclosure to potential franchise buyers.

In 2010, all litigation surrounding the franchise disputes was settled out of court. The trade magazine Franchise Times ran a detailed article in their November/December 2010 issue outlining the outcome and history of the complex case, which included attorney liability allegations. According to that article, "sources stated that it was the attorneys and law firms that stepped in to take responsibility for the settlement payments".

== See also ==
- Dinners Ready
- Super Suppers
