= Dinners Ready =

American meal preparation business

Dinners Ready was a franchised meal preparation business based in Mukilteo, Washington. The company was founded by Brad Vorhees and Scott Farrar in 2003. Vorhees left the company in 2005. Mr. Farrar was named one of Seattle's top 25 innovators of 2006 by the Seattle Business Monthly. Dinners Ready was located in the Seattle area. Dinners Ready was part of the food industry referred to as meal assembly, where customers can visit a local preparation kitchen and assemble meals to freeze and cook at home. The Dinners Ready model evolved to be predominantly delivery-only. The meals serve two, four, or six people and come complete with side dishes. There were twenty meal choices, with the menu changing each month.

== See also ==
- Dream Dinners
- Super Suppers
