= Washington State Route 96 =

State highway in Snohomish County, Washington, US

State Route 96
- SR 96 highlighted in red

Route information
- Auxiliary route of SR 9
- Maintained by WSDOT
- Length: 6.75 mi (10.86 km)
- Existed: 1991–present

Major junctions
- West end: I-5 in Paine Field-Lake Stickney
- SR 527 in Mill Creek
- East end: SR 9 near Snohomish

Location
- Country: United States
- State: Washington
- County: Snohomish

Highway system
- State highways in Washington; Interstate; US; State; Scenic; Pre-1964; 1964 renumbering; Former
← SR 92	→ US 97

State Route 96 (SR 96) is a 6.75-mile-long (10.86 km) state highway located within Snohomish County in the U.S. state of Washington. The highway travels east from an interchange with Interstate 5 (I-5) in Paine Field-Lake Stickney through Mill Creek and an intersection with SR 527 to end at SR 9 south of Snohomish. SR 96 was established in 1991 and follows the route of a wagon road constructed by Snohomish County in the late 1880s to connect Snohomish to Seattle. The highway was closed during the Great Coastal Gale of 2007 after a culvert was damaged and its eastern terminus was re-constructed in 2009 to serve increasing volumes of traffic.

== Route description ==
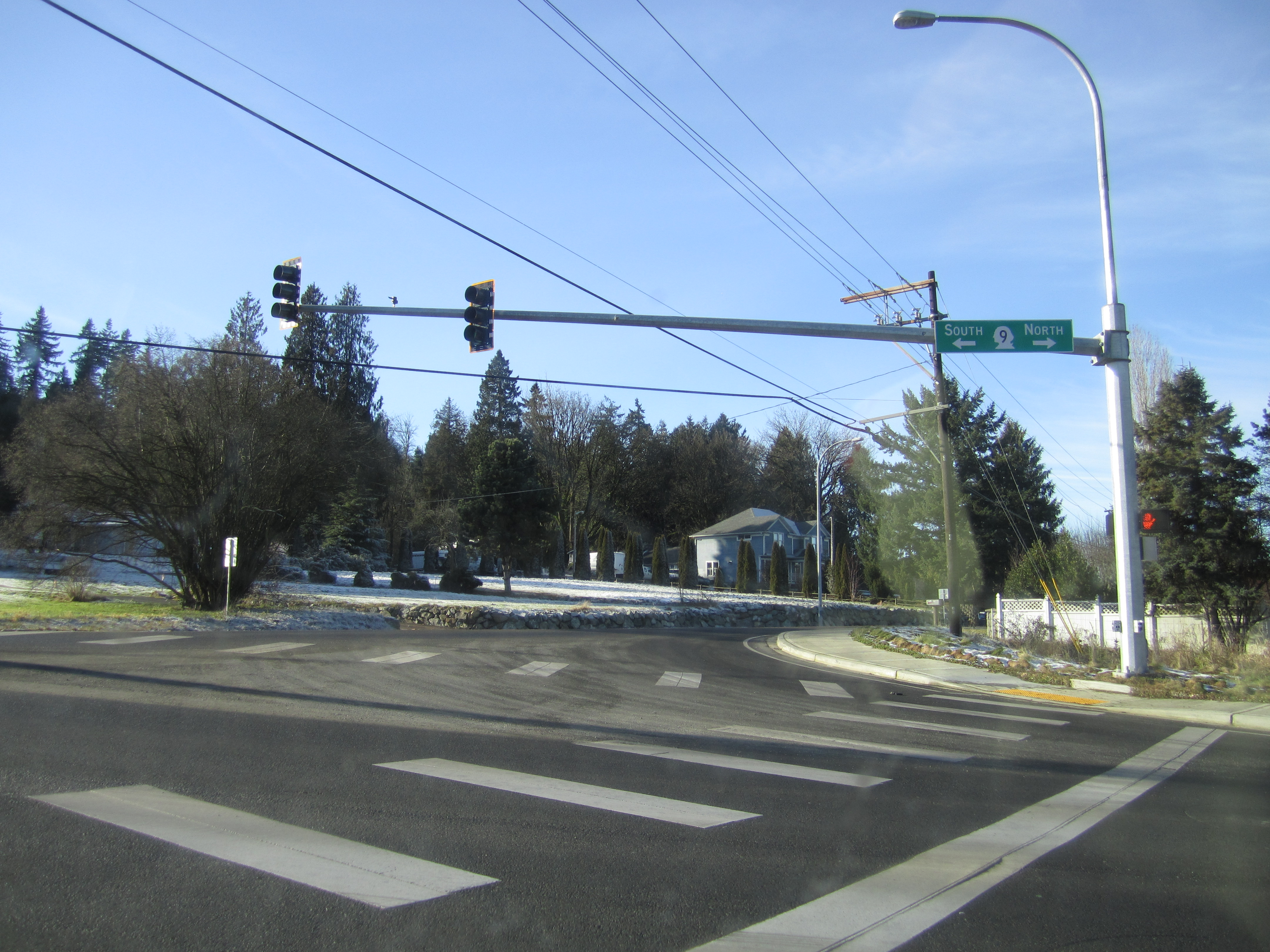
The eastern terminus of SR 96 south of Snohomish, viewed from SR 9

SR 96 begins as 128th Street at a diamond interchange with I-5 in Paine Field-Lake Stickney, located in suburban Snohomish County south of Everett. The highway travels east and crosses the Interurban Trail and North Creek before turning southeast onto 132nd Street and entering the city of Mill Creek. SR 96 passes north of McCollum Pioneer Park and Henry M. Jackson High School before it intersects SR 527 at a commercial center known as Murphy's Corner. The highway continues east and passes Archbishop Murphy High School before turning northeast onto Seattle Hill Road and ascends the eponymous hill into Silver Firs. SR 96 descends southeast into the Snohomish River valley from Larimers Corner to Rees Corner on Lowell-Larimer Road, ending at an intersection with SR 9 south of Snohomish.

Every year, the Washington State Department of Transportation (WSDOT) conducts a series of surveys on its highways in the state to measure traffic volume. This is expressed in terms of annual average daily traffic (AADT), which is a measure of traffic volume for any average day of the year. In 2011, WSDOT calculated that the busiest section of SR 96 was its western terminus at I-5, serving 43,000 vehicles, while the least busy section is its eastern terminus at SR 9, serving 11,000 vehicles.

== History ==
Seattle Hill Road and 131st Street have existed since 1885 on their present route as part of a wagon road constructed by Snohomish County connecting Snohomish to Seattle. The highway from Seattle Hill through Mill Creek was completed by the late 1950s and paved in the early 1960s by the county. The road's westernmost segment was previously named "Post Road" and was extended to Paine Field in the late 1960s, a few years after its interchange with I-5 was opened in 1965. SR 96 was added to the state highway system and codified in 1991, traveling east from I-5 to SR 9 via Mill Creek. Seattle Hill Road was bypassed to the south by Cathcart Way in 2004, planned by the county government since 1978 to redirect traffic on the two-lane SR 96. During the Great Coastal Gale in December 2007, Seattle Hill Road was washed out by a damaged culvert and subsequently closed until late January as WSDOT crews repaired the highway. The eastern terminus of SR 96, an intersection with SR 9, was expanded between April 2008 and December 2009 by WSDOT, adding turning lanes and a traffic camera.

A section of SR 96 near McCollum Park in northwestern Mill Creek was built over landfill that later settled, creating an uneven road surface. It required annual repaving by WSDOT and a plan to replace the section with a permanent bridge was proposed in the late 2010s.

== Major intersections ==
The entire highway is in Snohomish County.

Location	mi	km	Destinations	Notes
Paine Field-Lake Stickney	0.00– 0.12	0.00– 0.19	I-5 – Seattle, Vancouver BC	Western terminus, interchange
Mill Creek	1.37	2.20	SR 527 (Bothell-Everett Highway) – Everett	
	6.75	10.86	SR 9 – Snohomish	Eastern terminus
1.000 mi = 1.609 km; 1.000 km = 0.621 mi
