= Washington State Route 527 =

State highway in Snohomish County, Washington, US

State Route 527
- Bothell–Everett Highway
- A map of southwest Snohomish County with SR 527 highlighted in red

Route information
- Auxiliary route of I-5
- Maintained by WSDOT
- Length: 9.29 mi (14.95 km)
- Existed: 1964–present

Major junctions
- South end: I-405 in Bothell
- SR 524 in Bothell; SR 96 in Everett
- North end: I-5 / SR 99 / SR 526 in Everett

Location
- Country: United States
- State: Washington
- County: Snohomish

Highway system
- State highways in Washington; Interstate; US; State; Scenic; Pre-1964; 1964 renumbering; Former
← SR 526	→ SR 528

State Route 527 (SR 527, also known as the Bothell–Everett Highway) is a state highway in Snohomish County, Washington. It travels 9 miles (14 km) from north to south, connecting the northern Seattle suburbs of Bothell, Mill Creek, and Everett. The highway intersects Interstate 405 (I-405) at its southern terminus, SR 96 in northern Mill Creek, and I-5 at an interchange with SR 99 and SR 526 in Everett.

The Bothell–Everett Highway was built in the 1910s as part of the intercity Pacific Highway and briefly formed part of U.S. Route 99 (US 99) in 1926. The following year, US 99 was moved west to a new highway that would later become modern-day SR 99. The old route to the east was signed by the state as Secondary State Highway 2A (SSH 2A) from 1937 to 1943 and SSH 2J from 1957 to 1964, when it was renumbered as SR 527.

Since its opening, suburban development in Mill Creek and northern Bothell has contributed to traffic congestion on stretches of SR 527. During the 1990s and early 2000s, the state government funded several projects that widened the highway to its present four-lane configuration with sidewalks, bus pullouts, and bicycle lanes. The southernmost 2.5 miles (4.0 km) of the highway, from SR 522 to I-405, was transferred to the Bothell city government in 2011 and decommissioned from the state highway system.

== Route description ==
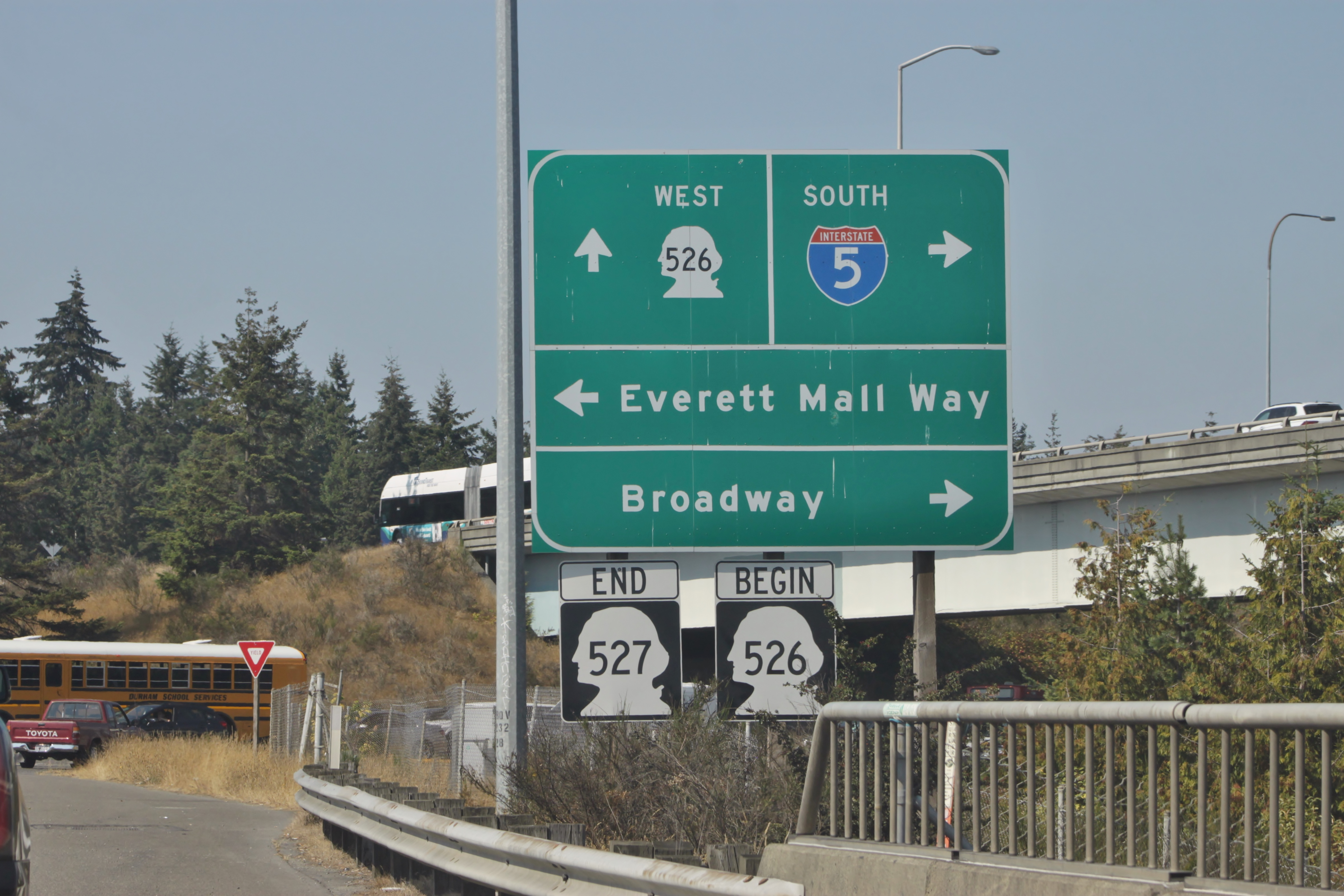
The northern terminus of SR 527, at an intersection with SR 99, Broadway, and SR 526 in Everett

SR 527 begins as a continuation of the Bothell–Everett Highway at a partial cloverleaf interchange with I-405 in northern Bothell, located in Snohomish County. The interchange is located adjacent to the Canyon Park park and ride, a major bus transfer facility. The highway travels northeast through the Canyon Park business park and turns north after crossing North Creek, following it to a junction with SR 524 at Thrasher's Corner. SR 527 then crosses into the unincorporated North Creek area, which is filled with suburban homes and apartment complexes that line the road, along with commercial areas at Kennard Corner and near North Creek County Park.

The highway continues north into the center of Mill Creek at a junction with 164th Street Southeast. Through central Mill Creek, SR 527 forms the border between the Mill Creek Town Center, a lifestyle center that runs to the west along North Creek, and the city's suburban neighborhoods to the east. Near Henry M. Jackson High School, the highway turns northeast and intersects SR 96 at Murphy's Corner, located at the southern city limit of Everett. The intersection has limited turns due to the acute angle at which SR 527 enters from the south; an auxiliary street to the west (16th Avenue SE) is used to access southbound SR 527 from the west side of SR 96.

Following the junction, SR 527 curves along the shore of Silver Lake, passing two small parks. The highway briefly travels west along the northeast shore of the lake before turning sharply to the north onto 19th Avenue Southeast and passes through a commercial district while remaining parallel to I-5. Near the Eastmont park and ride, SR 527 intersects I-5 and crosses over the freeway to its terminus, a junction with SR 99, Broadway, and part of SR 526 (the Boeing Freeway). The highways connect SR 527 to Downtown Everett, the Everett Mall area, and the Boeing Assembly Plant, respectively.

SR 527 is maintained by the Washington State Department of Transportation (WSDOT), which conducts an annual survey on state highways to measure traffic volume in terms of annual average daily traffic. Average traffic volumes on the highway in 2016 ranged from a minimum of 19,000 vehicles in northern Mill Creek to a maximum of 54,000 vehicles at the I-405 interchange. The highway is generally four lanes wide with a landscaped median or center turn lane in some areas. The entire route is designated as part of the National Highway System, a network of roads identified as important to the national economy, defense, and mobility. The corridor is also served by buses operated by Everett Transit and Community Transit, including the Swift Green Line—a bus rapid transit route that began service in 2019 and runs every 10–20 minutes between stations on SR 527 with transit signal priority and other features.

== History ==
An early wagon road along North Creek between Bothell and Lowell (now part of Everett) was built in the late 19th century by local settlers and the county government. The road was graded and improved with a permanent (but unpaved) surface in the early 1910s using funds allocated by the state government. It was incorporated into the state highway system in 1913 as part of the Pacific Highway, the primary cross-state route in Western Washington. The Bothell–Everett portion of the highway was paved with concrete in 1916, following a bond issue for improved roads approved by Snohomish County voters the year prior. It cost $183,750 to construct the 14.5-mile (23.3 km) section.

The Pacific Highway, later numbered to State Road 1 in 1923 and part of U.S. Route 99 in 1926, remained on the Bothell route until the completion of a straighter north–south highway to the west in 1927. The state government originally planned to relinquish control of the old route through Bothell to the King and Snohomish county governments, but later agreed to continue maintenance of the highway. The Bothell–Everett highway was incorporated into part of SSH 2A in 1937, forming a continuous route between Renton and Everett via the Eastside. SSH 2A was later truncated to Bothell in 1943, removing the Snohomish County section, but it was returned to the state highway system in 1957 as the newly created SSH 2J. SSH 2J was renumbered to SR 527 in 1964 as part of a new numbering system implemented by the state government, which today forms the modern state highway system. It connected SR 522 in downtown Bothell to the Broadway Interchange in southern Everett, built in 1969 to connect I-5, US 99 (which was replaced by SR 99 in 1971), and SR 526. The highway's interchange with I-405 in northern Bothell was opened to traffic in November 1969.

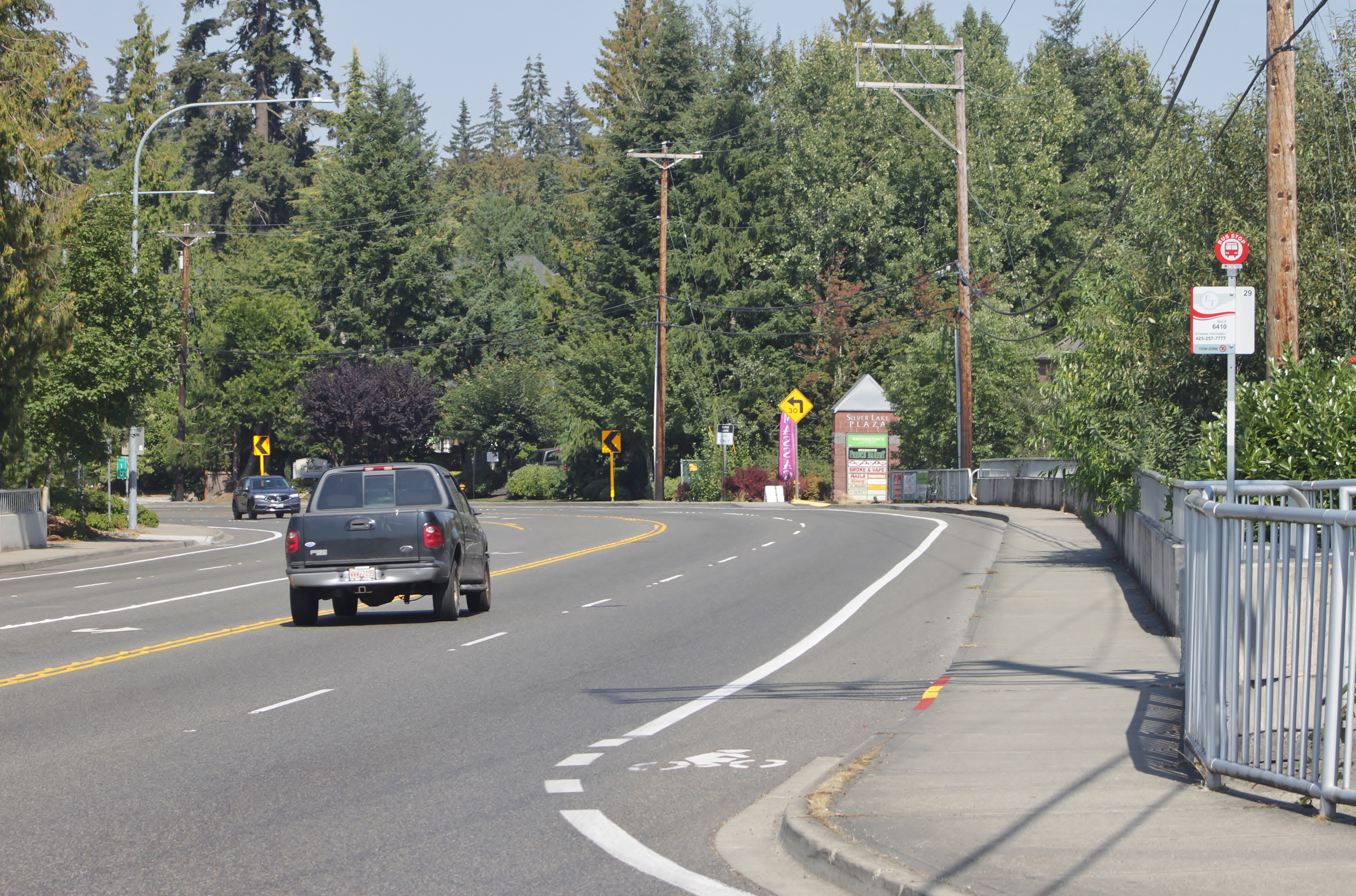
A section of SR 527 in Everett that was widened by the state government in 2006

Major suburban development in the Mill Creek area began in the 1970s and contributed to growing traffic congestion on SR 527, leading eventually to development moratoriums as temporary measures to quell growth. The northernmost section of the highway, in Everett between 112th Street and the Broadway Interchange, was expanded to five lanes in the late 1970s using city funding, while the rest remained two lanes wide. In 1980, the state department of transportation began preliminary planning for a wide-scale project to widen the highway to five lanes (including a center turn lane and sidewalks) in 1980. The state legislature funded the widening project in 1990 with proceeds from a statewide gas tax increase, which coincided with the end of the development moratorium.

The first phase of the project, from 228th Street near Canyon Park to 208th Street at Thrashers Corner, was completed in 1991 at a cost of $5.6 million. Construction of the second phase, between Thrashers Corner and 164th Street in Mill Creek, was delayed by concerns that stormwater runoff would be inadequately handled by the new road. It began construction in 1993 and was completed four years later at a cost of $18.8 million. The City of Bothell also began its own widening project on a stretch of the highway south of Canyon Park in 1998, having decided against rerouting SR 527 onto a new bypass of the city center. The state government had proposed transferring the section to Bothell in the 1980s, which was met with protests from city officials.

The third phase of the state's widening project, between 164th Street and 132nd Street, was constructed from 2003 to 2004 and cost $27.8 million. The project included new bicycle lanes along the curb of the highway, as well as decorated sound walls. The fourth and final phase, from 132nd Street to 112th Street, was completed in May 2006 and cost $21 million to construct. The two-year project included the construction of barriers, culverts, and detention ponds along the shore of Silver Lake, which also gained a pedestrian walkway with interpretive signs.

In 2009, the City of Bothell adopted plans to convert the southernmost blocks of SR 527 into a mixed-use boulevard and submitted a request to transfer a section of the highway from the state's control. The proposed transfer received the recommendation of the state transportation commission in July 2010 and was passed by the state legislature in April 2011. As a result, the southernmost 2.51 miles (4.04 km) of SR 527 was decommissioned from the state highway system and the highway's southern terminus was moved from SR 522 to I-405. The $23 million boulevard, funded by a state grant and city revenue, was completed in August 2017 and added wider sidewalks, four sets of parallel parking lanes, a business access lane also designated for use by bicyclists, and medians to separate traffic.

== Major intersections ==
The entire highway is in Snohomish County.

Location	mi	km	Destinations	Notes
Bothell	0.00	0.00	I-405 – Bellevue, Bellevue, Lynnwood	Continues south as Bothell–Everett Highway
Bothell	1.11	1.79	SR 524 (208th Street) – Maltby	
Mill Creek	6.02	9.69	SR 96 west to I-5 via 16th Avenue	
Mill Creek	6.22	10.01	SR 96 east (132nd Street)	
Everett	8.99	14.47	I-5 north – Vancouver BC	
Everett	9.29	14.95	I-5 south / SR 99 south (Everett Mall Way) / SR 526 west / Broadway – Seattle, Everett	
1.000 mi = 1.609 km; 1.000 km = 0.621 mi
