= Mill Creek Town Center =

Retail and lifestyle complex in Mill Creek, Washington, U.S.

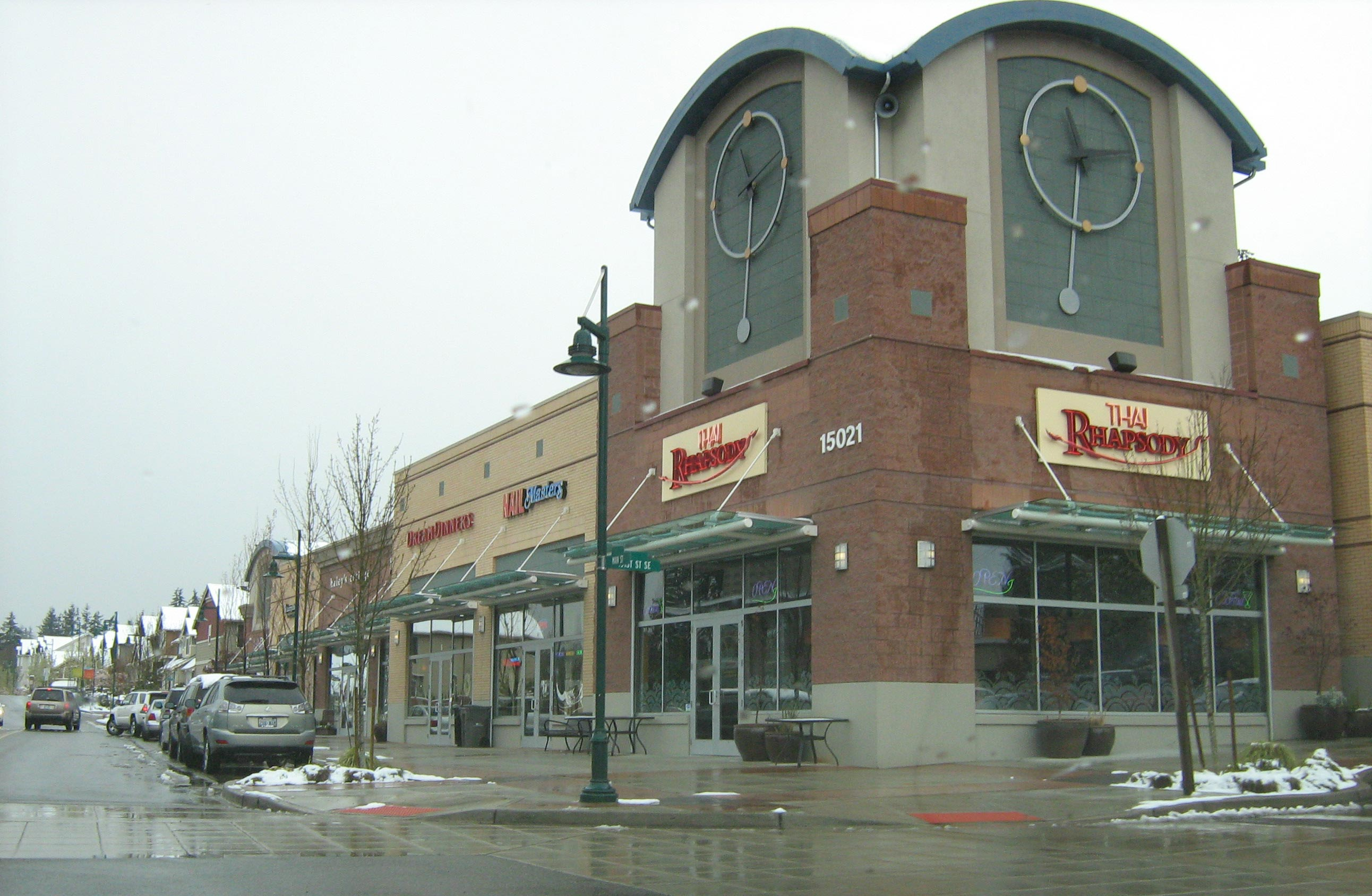
- Location: 15310 Main St. Mill Creek, Washington, U.S.
- Coordinates: 47°51′33″N 122°13′13″W
- Opened: 2004
- Num. of stores: 88
- Num. of anchor tenants: 4 (3 open, 1 vacant)
- Website: www.millcreektowncenter.biz

Mill Creek Town Center is a shopping center in Mill Creek, Washington, United States. It is located along the Bothell-Everett Highway, and has 88 shops, restaurants, and other services. The development opened in 2004 and is described as a lifestyle center.

== History ==
The town of Mill Creek was designed in the 1970s without a downtown, and the Mill Creek Town Center was created to give the town a commercial and social core. After the town adopted a comprehensive plan in 1992, citizens came together to develop plans for a town center, and construction began 10 years later. The complex opened in 2004.
