= Washington State Route 529 =

State highway in Snohomish County, Washington, US

State Route 529
- Yellow Ribbon Highway
- SR 529 highlighted in red

Route information
- Auxiliary route of I-5
- Maintained by WSDOT
- Length: 7.88 mi (12.68 km)
- Existed: 1971–present

Major junctions
- South end: I-5 in Everett
- US 2 in Everett; I-5 in Marysville
- North end: SR 528 in Marysville

Location
- Country: United States
- State: Washington
- County: Snohomish

Highway system
- State highways in Washington; Interstate; US; State; Scenic; Pre-1964; 1964 renumbering; Former
← SR 528	→ SR 530

State Route 529 (SR 529, officially the Yellow Ribbon Highway) is a Washington state highway that connects the cities of Everett and Marysville. The 7.88-mile-long (12.68 km) roadway extends north from an interchange with Interstate 5 (I-5), numbered exit 193, past the western terminus of U.S. Route 2 (US 2), its spur route, Downtown Everett and Naval Station Everett to cross the Snohomish River onto Smith Island. After crossing the Steamboat Slough, the road encounters an interchange with I-5, numbered exit 198, before crossing the Ebey Slough and entering Marysville. In Marysville, SR 529 ends at SR 528. Before being realigned in 1991, SR 529 started at exit 192 of I-5 and traveled north as Broadway through Downtown Everett to Marysville.

A map published in 1895 of the Snohomish area showed the current and former routes in Everett already complete. By 1898, citizens of both Everett and Marysville were interested in a road that would traverse the Snohomish River delta. A 1911 map of the Mount Vernon area showed the route in Marysville, but the bridges between Everett and Marysville were railroad bridges. The roads were combined with other highways to form the Pacific Highway in 1913, which became State Road 1 in 1923 and US 99 in 1926, but the cutoff actually opened in 1927. State Road 1 became Primary State Highway 1 (PSH 1) in 1937 and PSH 1 became US 99 in 1964. After US 99 was decommissioned, SR 529 was established in 1971. Naval Station Everett was opened in 1991 and SR 529 was realigned on Everett Avenue and Marine View Drive to serve the new naval base. The former route of the highway, now named Broadway, had an interchange with I-5 that was reconstructed between 2005 and 2008 to include high-occupancy vehicle (HOV) lanes and now includes a single-point urban interchange with 41st Street.

== Route description ==
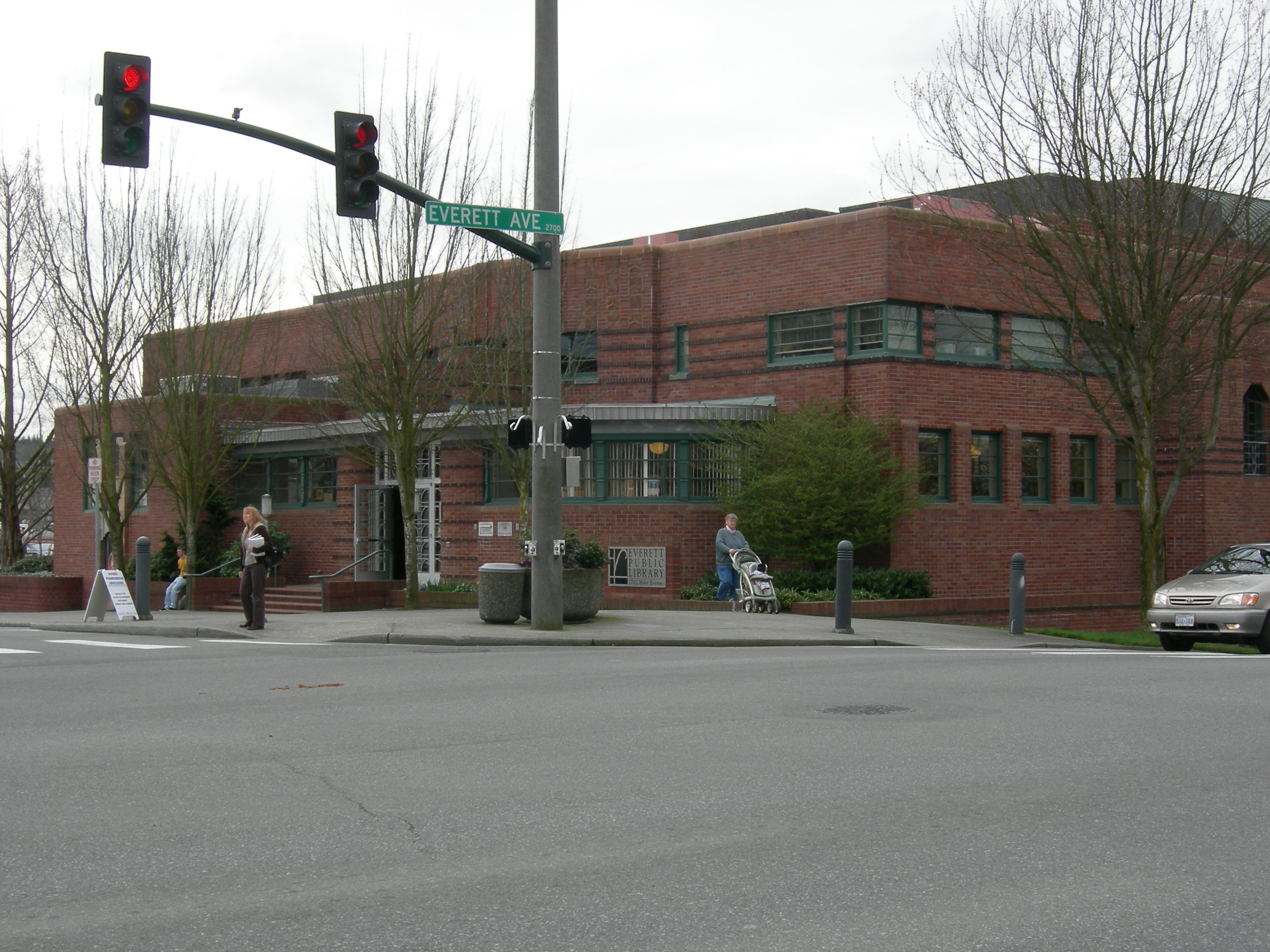
The main branch of the Everett Public Library, located at the intersection of Everett Avenue (SR 529) and Hoyt Avenue

SR 529 begins at exit 193 on I-5, a half-diamond interchange with Pacific Avenue in downtown Everett. The highway turns north on Maple Street and travels along the side of I-5, intersecting the western terminus of US 2 at Hewitt and California avenues near Judd and Black Park.

The roadway then west to become Everett Avenue, which continues east to I-5 as SR 529 Spur. Everett Avenue then travels west through Downtown Everett and intersects various streets including Broadway, which was once SR 529 and US 99, Hoyt Avenue, which is the location of the Everett Public Library, listed on the National Register of Historic Places, and Marine View Drive, where the road turns north to parallel a BNSF Railway route and serve the Everett waterfront, which includes Naval Station Everett and Jetty Island, accessed via a ferry near 10th Street.

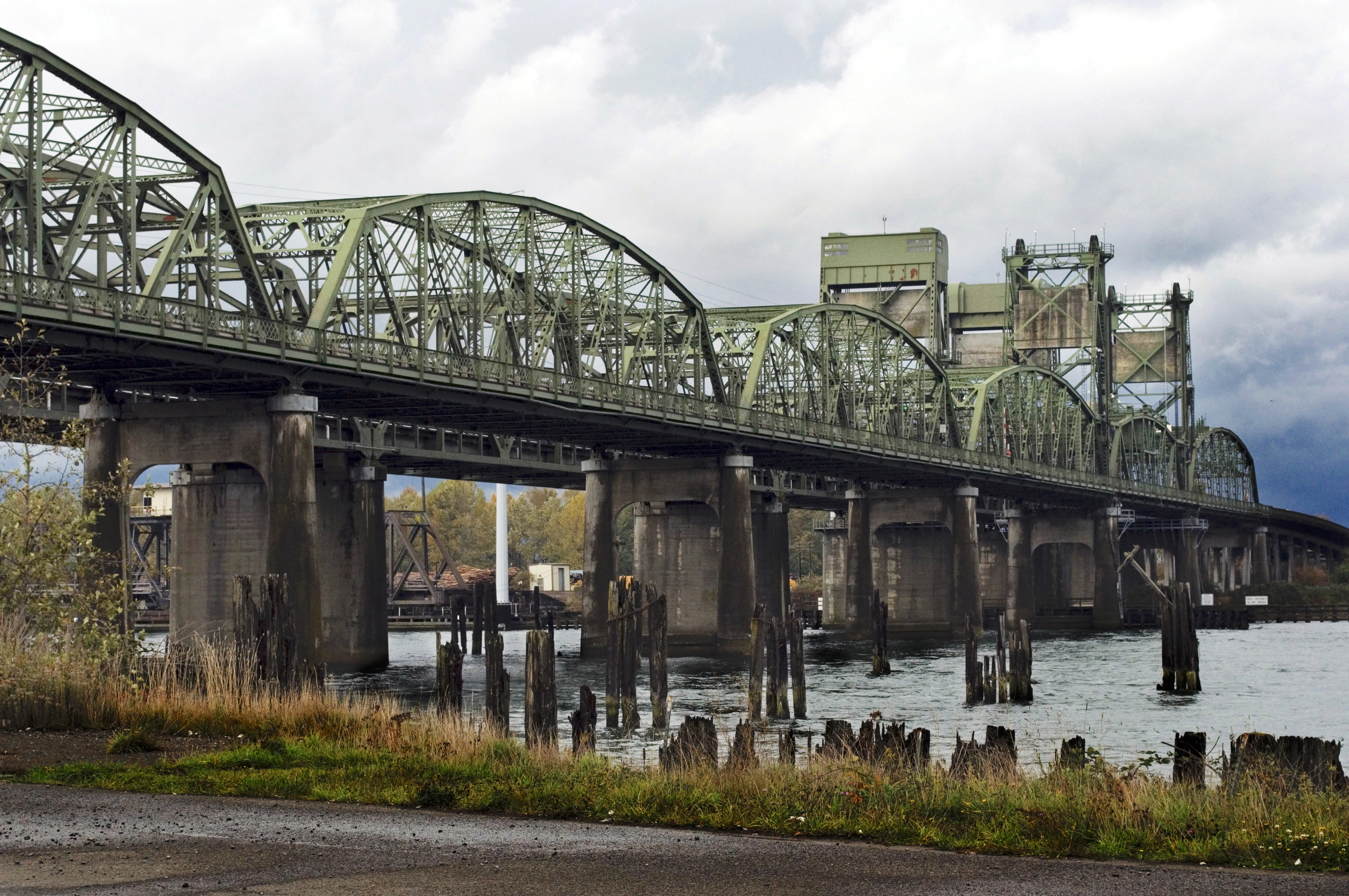
SR 529 crosses the Snohomish River on a pair of vertical-lift bridges.

Leaving the waterfront, SR 529 parallels the Snohomish River southeast to a partial cloverleaf interchange with Broadway, which was SR 529 before 1991 and US 99, and Marine View Drive, which continues southeast to I-5 at exit 195. The highway travels over the Snohomish River onto Smith Island, part of the Delta neighborhood of Everett that is named after the delta of the Snohomish River located to the southwest. The Snohomish River crossing was the busiest segment of SR 529 in 2007, with an estimated daily average of 33,000 motorists. Crossing the Steamboat Slough as a freeway, SR 529 interchanges with I-5 northbound as exit 198 and enters Marysville after crossing the Ebey Slough. Now named State Avenue, the street passes through the waterfront area of Downtown Marysville and the Marysville Mall before ending at the intersection with Fourth Street, signed as SR 528 while State Avenue continues north to Smokey Point.

=== Former route (1971–1991) ===
Prior to 1991, SR 529 was 1.19 miles (1.92 km) shorter and extended from I-5 and 41st Street (exit 192) to Marysville via Broadway. The former and current routes both used the same route from the Marine View Drive intersection to Marysville. The former southern terminus was a large interchange with I-5 and 41st Street, which was SR 526 until 1969, that had an underpass under I-5 southbound for a northbound I-5 offramp to Broadway and connections to I-5 northbound were accessed via 41st Street prior to 2005. Broadway continued north past the Everett Memorial Stadium, home of the Everett AquaSox, Everett Avenue (current SR 529) and the Everett Community College to join current SR 529 at the Marine View Drive interchange. Between 2005 and 2008, exit 192 on I-5 was reconstructed. A new flyover ramp from I-5 northbound to Broadway northbound was added and the 41st Street interchange was transformed into a single-point urban interchange.

== History ==
As early as 1915, citizens of both Everett and Marysville proposed that a road between the two cities across the Snohomish River delta was needed. At the time, the only route between the two cities was a winding road traveled around the northeast side of the delta. The first bridge across the delta was opened the following year, connecting Everett to Smith Island.

In 1913, the Pacific Highway was added to the state highway system and used Broadway (former SR 529) in Everett and State Avenue in Marysville to travel between Seattle and the Canada–US border. The Pacific Highway between Everett and Marysville, named the Vernon Road, was paved in 1916 and paid by a county road bond issue. The highway was later signed as State Road 1 in 1923, which became the Washington segment of U.S. Route 99 (US 99) during the creation of the United States Numbered Highways in 1926. Since the bridges over the Snohomish River delta weren't complete at the time of planning, US 99 used present-day US 2, SR 204 and Sunnyside Boulevard to connect Everett and Marysville. The bridges were completed in 1926 and opened on August 23, 1927, after the creation of US 99.

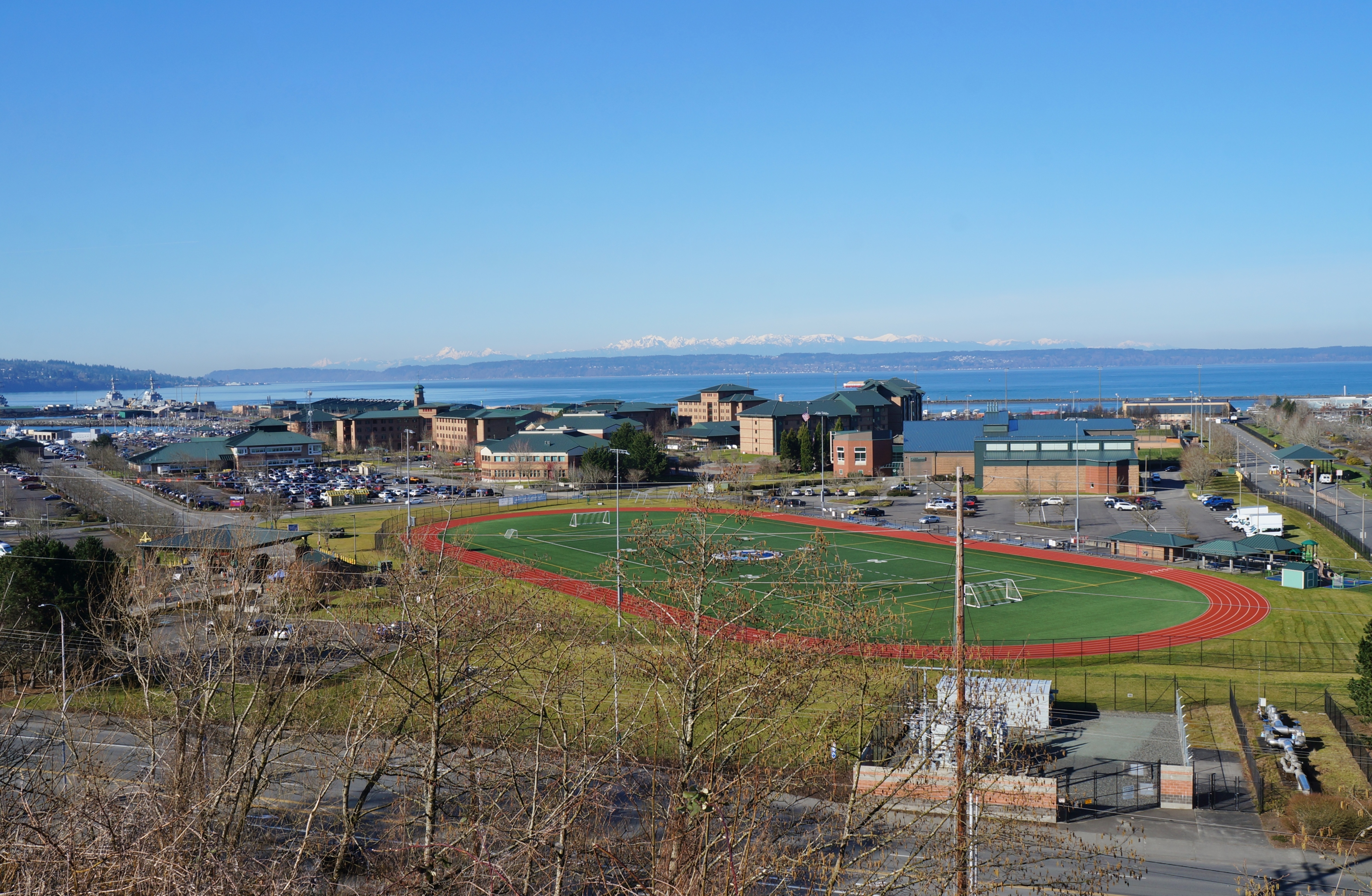
In 1991, SR 529 was realigned to serve Naval Station Everett

State Road 1 was replaced by Primary State Highway 1 (PSH 1) in the Primary state highways, which was created in 1937. A second set of bridges crossing the Snohomish River delta were completed in 1954; however, the expansion excluded the Ebey Slough Bridge, which remained single-spanned. US 99 fully replaced PSH 1 during the 1964 highway renumbering. Interstate 5 (I-5) later replaced US 99 between 1966 and 1970. SR 529 was created in 1971 and ran from what was SR 526 until 1969, now 41st Street, north on old US 99 (Broadway) to SR 528 in Marysville. The state government considered a transfer of the Ebey Slough Bridge to local control in the late 1980s, but dropped the proposal.

In May 1983, the location of a new home port for the United States Navy was narrowed down to Everett and Seattle, as proposed by Senator Henry M. Jackson (D), who died later that September. Everett was selected in April 1984 and the groundbreaking ceremony was held on November 9, 1987. On September 5, 1991, the new navy base was opened and SR 529 was shortened and rerouted to serve the new base, later named Naval Station Everett. A new spur route to serve as a connector between SR 529 and I-5 northbound in 1991. The highway was declared the Yellow Ribbon Highway in November 2009 by the Legislature after a successful campaign led by Everett resident Nathan Olson. The sign unveiling ceremony was attended by WSDOT, elected officials, Naval Station Everett and community members on November 5, 2009. The 4-lane fixed bridge over Ebey Slough that connects SR 529 from Everett to Marysville was fully completed in 2013, replacing a two-lane swing bridge that was 87 years old.

The southbound Steamboat Slough bridge was rebuilt in 1993. Following the discovery of additional wear in 2023, the speed limit on the bridge was slowed to 25 mph (40 km/h) and three closures to replace gusset plates were scheduled. WSDOT had already planned to rehabilitate the other Steamboat Slough bridge as well as both Snohomish River crossings later in the year.

The I-5 and SR 529 interchange in Marysville is planned to be expanded by 2024 with the addition of two ramps and a roundabout that would provide complete access in all directions. The project would also provide traffic to Marysville with a bypass of the congested SR 528 corridor, which is often blocked by trains. The project is planned to concurrently occur with rehabilitation work on both spans of the Steamboat Slough Bridge and the northbound span of the Snohomish River Bridge; the latter bridge will be closed for four months in late 2023 for WSDOT to conduct the work in compliance with United States Coast Guard regulations.

== Major intersections ==
The entire highway is in Snohomish County.

Location	mi	km	Destinations	Notes
Everett	0.00	0.00	I-5 south – Seattle	Southern terminus; interchange
Everett	0.19– 0.19	0.31– 0.31	US 2 east (Hewitt Avenue) – Snohomish	
Everett	0.38	0.61	SR 529 Spur east (Everett Avenue) to I-5 north	
Everett	0.87	1.40	Broadway	Former SR 529; earlier US 99
Everett	4.82	7.76	Broadway	Former SR 529; earlier US 99
Everett	4.82	7.76	To I-5 south via Marine View Drive	Interchange
Everett	4.82	7.76	South end of freeway	
Everett	5.01– 5.52	8.06– 8.88	Snohomish River	
Everett	5.70	9.17	34th Avenue NE / 28th Place NE – Smith Island	
Everett	6.49	10.44	34th Avenue NE / 40th Place NE	
Marysville	7.29	11.73	I-5 north – Vancouver B.C.	Interchange
Marysville	7.29	11.73	North end of freeway	
Marysville	7.88	12.68	SR 528 (4th Street) to I-5 – Tulalip	Northern terminus; continues north as State Avenue
1.000 mi = 1.609 km; 1.000 km = 0.621 mi

== Spur route ==
State Route 529 Spur
- Location: Everett, Washington
- Length: 0.20 mi (320 m)
- Existed: 1991–present

SR 529 also has a 0.20-mile (0.32 km) long spur route in Everett that extends from SR 529 to Interstate 5 (I-5) northbound, numbered exit 194. Since exit 193, the southern terminus of SR 529, only serves I-5 southbound, the spur route was established in 1991 to complete the interchange. Exit 194 also serves U.S. Route 2 (US 2), which terminates at SR 529. In 2007, the highway had a daily average of 17,000 motorists.

Major intersections

The entire spur is in Everett, Snohomish County.

mi	km	Destinations	Notes
0.00	0.00	SR 529 (Maple Street) – Port of Everett, Naval Station	Western terminus
0.20	0.32	I-5 north – Vancouver B.C.	Eastern terminus
1.000 mi = 1.609 km; 1.000 km = 0.621 mi
