= Washington State Route 528 =

State highway in Marysville, Washington, U.S.

State Route 528
- 4th Street; 64th Street
- SR 528 highlighted in red.

Route information
- Auxiliary route of I-5
- Maintained by WSDOT
- Length: 3.46 mi (5.57 km)
- Existed: 1964–present

Major junctions
- West end: I-5 in Marysville
- SR 529 in Marysville
- East end: SR 9 in Marysville

Location
- Country: United States
- State: Washington
- County: Snohomish

Highway system
- State highways in Washington; Interstate; US; State; Scenic; Pre-1964; 1964 renumbering; Former
← SR 527	→ SR 529

State Route 528 (SR 528) is an east–west state highway in Snohomish County, Washington, located entirely within the city of Marysville. It travels 3.5 miles (5.6 km) from an interchange with Interstate 5 (I-5) in downtown Marysville to a junction with SR 9. The four-lane highway uses two local streets—4th Street and 64th Street—and primarily functions as a commuter route to the eastern outskirts of Marysville.

The corridor was added to the state highway system in 1963 as a branch of Primary State Highway 1 (PSH 1). During a highway renumbering the following year, this branch became SR 528; at the time, the highway was not yet complete and was only signed through downtown Marysville. SR 528 was completed in 1988 following the opening of a bridge over Allen Creek; in later years, the entire highway was expanded to four lanes.

== Route description ==
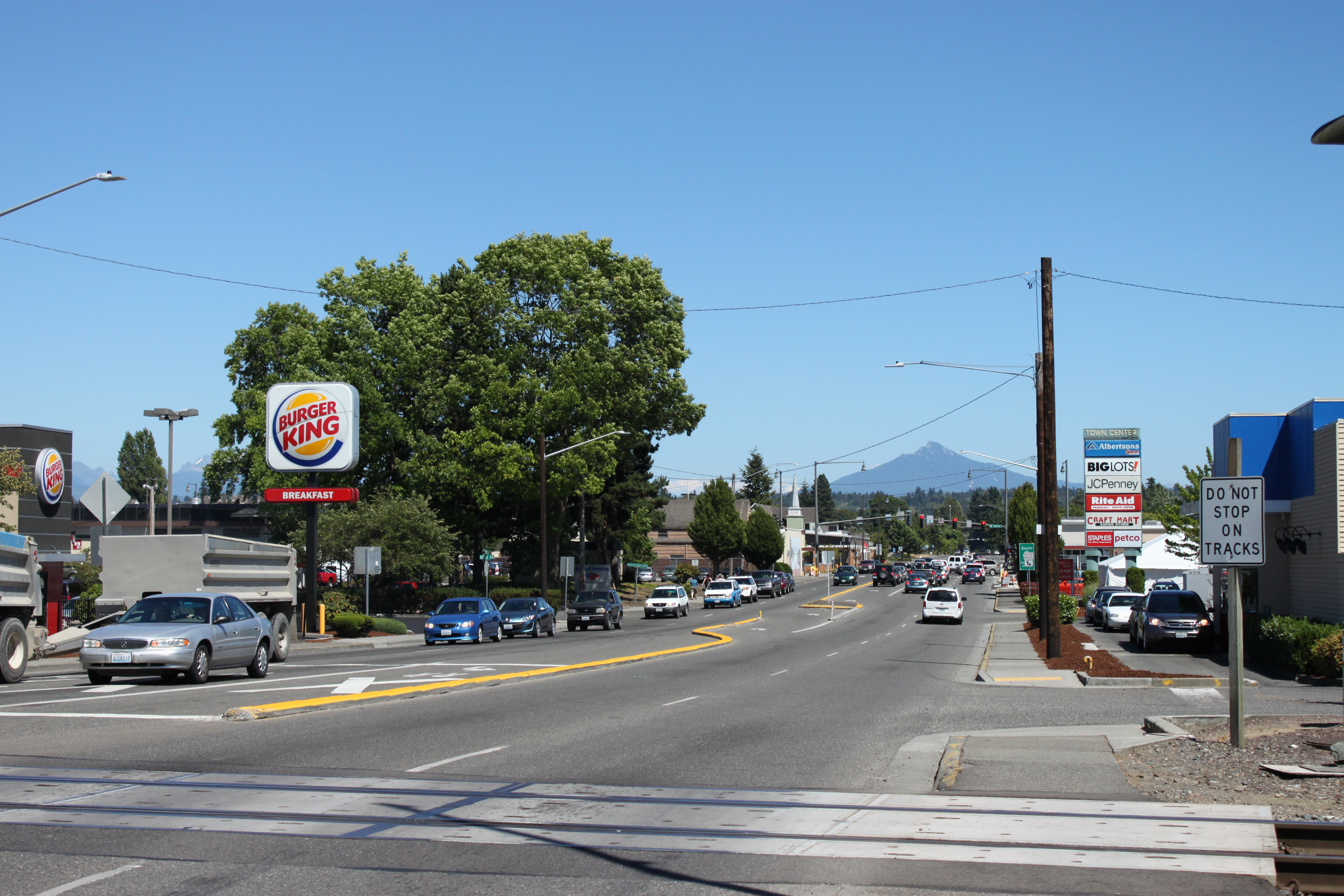
SR 528 in downtown Marysville, looking east from Cedar Avenue

SR 528 is 3.5 miles (5.6 km) long and lies entirely within the city of Marysville in northern Snohomish County. It begins at an interchange with I-5 and Marine Drive on the city's border with the Tulalip Indian Reservation near Ebey Slough. The highway travels east into downtown Marysville on 4th Street, crossing over a section of the BNSF Railway's Bellingham Subdivision (which also carries Amtrak's Cascades passenger trains) near Comeford Park and the city's landmark water tower. SR 528 then passes north of a shopping center and intersects State Avenue, which serves as the northernmost section of SR 529 and was formerly part of U.S. Route 99 (US 99). This highway continues south from Marysville over the Snohomish River delta to Everett and Naval Station Everett.

The highway continues east on 4th Street and crosses Allen Creek, a tributary of Ebey Slough with large wetlands. After crossing the creek, SR 528 veers northeast onto 64th Street Northeast, returning to its due east course at the southeast corner of Jennings Memorial Park. The street passes through residential neighborhoods in eastern Marysville and ascends a hill. SR 528 then terminates at an intersection with SR 9 near Lake Cassidy and Lake Stevens. Community Transit operates two bus routes on the corridor: Route 209, which runs on the whole street and connects Marysville to Smokey Point and Lake Stevens; and Route 222, which uses a short section from 67th to 83rd avenues and connects Marysville to the Tulalip Indian Reservation.

SR 528 is a suburban arterial with four lanes, continuous sidewalks, and bicycle lanes in some sections. It is mainly used by commuter traffic within Marysville and to connect I-5 and SR 9, becoming congested during rush hours. The Washington State Department of Transportation (WSDOT) conducts an annual survey of traffic volumes on state highways measured in terms of annual average daily traffic. Traffic volumes on SR 528 range from a minimum of 14,000 vehicles at SR 9 to a maximum of 33,000 vehicles at the I-5 interchange. The westernmost section of SR 528 between I-5 and SR 529 is designated as a minor route of the National Highway System.

== History ==
Marysville was established in 1878 and platted in 1885, including 4th Street as one of its principal east–west streets. Initially, the only bridge across Allen Creek connected 3rd Street with Sunnyside Boulevard, forming part of the Pacific Highway until the completion of four bridges over the Snohomish River delta in 1927. A trail used by Coast Salish peoples had existed between modern-day Marysville and Lake Stevens by the 19th century.

An east–west corridor to be built across Marysville was added to the state highway system in 1963 as a branch of Primary State Highway 1 (PSH 1), which was concurrent with US 99 and later I-5. The branch highway, which connected PSH 1 to Secondary State Highway 1A (SSH 1A), was planned to be signed once construction was completed by the state government at an unspecified date. The branch highway became SR 528 during the 1964 highway renumbering, which replaced the earlier system with a new numbering scheme. The state government widened the westernmost 1/2 mile (0.80 km) of SR 528 between I-5 and Columbia Avenue to 60 feet (18 m) and installed traffic signals in 1972. This section of 4th Street was also signed as a state highway.

The highway remained split into two sections by Allen Creek, with 4th Street in downtown and 64th Street (also named Hickok Road) to the east of the city. A connection for the two sections of SR 528 was planned in the late 1960s by the state government and approved for construction in 1969, but was delayed until the 1980s due to a lack of available funds from a federal program. The state government chose to keep the highway on 4th and 64th streets rather than relocate it to 88th Street, which had been studied but would require a new freeway interchange. Construction of the connector began in 1986 and was split into two phases, which cost a combined $1.5 million (equivalent to $3 million in 2023 dollars) and was mostly funded by the federal government. The final section of SR 528, which included a 56-foot-wide (17 m) bridge over Allen Creek and restored wetlands, opened in August 1988. The I-5 interchange in downtown Marysville was expanded in the 1970s and rebuilt in 1993 with wider ramps and a new traffic signal, funded by a federal grant.

A one-mile-long (1.6 km) section of SR 528 from 64th Avenue Northeast to 83rd Avenue Northeast was originally two lanes wide with a graded roadbed suitable for later widening. A project to widen the section to four lanes cost $4.8 million (equivalent to $8 million in 2023 dollars), largely funded by the state's Transportation Improvement Board, and was completed in November 2000. The eastern terminus at SR 9 was rebuilt in 2004 to add a traffic light, wider shoulders, and a left-turn lane. The westernmost section of the highway through downtown Marysville was rebuilt in 2008 as part of a repaving project that also replaced a set of water mains. A HAWK signal was installed on SR 528 near Asbery Field in 2017 to provide a safer pedestrian crossing.

Since the 2000s, the Marysville city government has studied various projects that would ease traffic congestion on 4th Street. A new set of ramps are planned to be added to the SR 529 interchange south of Marysville to provide an alternative route for Marysville commuters, connecting with an extension of 1st Street to 47th Avenue that opened in 2020. The I-5 interchange is planned to be partially rebuilt in the late 2020s to address congestion and allow for free right turns on red from the northbound ramp. A long-term plan from WSDOT and the Tulalip Tribes proposes adding a set of roundabouts to replace the traffic signals in and around the interchange.

== Major intersections ==
The entire route is in Marysville, Snohomish County.

mi	km	Destinations	Notes
0.00	0.00	I-5 – Vancouver B.C., Seattle, Tulalip	Continues west as Marine Drive
0.36	0.58	SR 529 south / State Avenue – Everett	Former US 99
3.46	5.57	SR 9 – Arlington, Snohomish	
1.000 mi = 1.609 km; 1.000 km = 0.621 mi
