= Eastmont, Washington =

- CDP
- Location of Eastmont, Washington.
- Coordinates: 47°53′51″N 122°10′24″W
- Country: United States
- State: Washington
- County: Snohomish

Area
  - Total: 5.11 sq mi (13.24 km^{2})
  - Land: 5.09 sq mi (13.19 km^{2})
  - Water: 0.019 sq mi (0.05 km^{2})
- Elevation: 404 ft (123 m)

Population (2010)
  - Total: 20,101
  - Density: 3,948/sq mi (1,524.5/km^{2})
- Time zone: UTC-8 (Pacific (PST))
  - Summer (DST): UTC-7 (PDT)
- GNIS feature ID: 2584969

Eastmont is a census-designated place (CDP) in Snohomish County, Washington, United States. As of the 2020 census, Eastmont had a population of 24,059. Eastmont is one of two CDPs that were created out of the former Seattle Hill-Silver Firs CDP in 2010, the other being Silver Firs. Eastmont is the location of Community Transit's Eastmont Park & Ride, which is serviced by Sound Transit Express route 513.

== Geography ==
Eastmont is located at 47°53′51″N 122°10′24″W (47.897402, -122.181536).

According to the United States Census Bureau, the CDP has a total area of 5.112 square miles (13.24 km^{2}), of which, 5.091 square miles (13.19 km^{2}) of it is land and 0.021 square miles (0.05 km^{2}) of it (0.41%) is water.

The CDP is surrounded by the City of Everett and contains several large residential neighborhoods.

== Demographics ==
Historical population
Census	Pop.	Note	%±
2010	20,101		—
2020	24,059		19.7%
U.S. Decennial Census; 2000 2010

Eastmont first appeared as a census designated place in the 2010 U.S. census formed from part of the deleted Seattle Hill-Silver Firs CDP.

=== Racial and ethnic composition ===
Eastmont CDP, Washington – Racial and ethnic composition Note: the US Census treats Hispanic/Latino as an ethnic category. This table excludes Latinos from the racial categories and assigns them to a separate category. Hispanics/Latinos may be of any race.
Race / Ethnicity (NH = Non-Hispanic)	Pop 2010	Pop 2020	% 2010	% 2020
White alone (NH)	15,379	15,546	76.51%	64.62%
Black or African American alone (NH)	421	805	2.09%	3.35%
Native American or Alaska Native alone (NH)	108	107	0.54%	0.44%
Asian alone (NH)	2,065	3,469	10.27%	14.42%
Native Hawaiian or Pacific Islander alone (NH)	34	100	0.17%	0.42%
Other race alone (NH)	39	165	0.19%	0.69%
Mixed race or Multiracial (NH)	797	1,736	3.96%	7.22%
Hispanic or Latino (any race)	1,258	2,131	6.26%	8.86%
Total	20,101	24,059	100.00%	100.00%

=== 2020 census ===
As of the 2020 census, Eastmont had a population of 24,059. The median age was 38.5 years. 25.8% of residents were under the age of 18 and 13.7% of residents were 65 years of age or older. For every 100 females there were 98.1 males, and for every 100 females age 18 and over there were 96.6 males age 18 and over.

99.7% of residents lived in urban areas, while 0.3% lived in rural areas.

There were 7,938 households in Eastmont, of which 40.4% had children under the age of 18 living in them. Of all households, 66.2% were married-couple households, 11.8% were households with a male householder and no spouse or partner present, and 16.5% were households with a female householder and no spouse or partner present. About 13.9% of all households were made up of individuals and 5.4% had someone living alone who was 65 years of age or older.

There were 8,089 housing units, of which 1.9% were vacant. The homeowner vacancy rate was 0.4% and the rental vacancy rate was 2.9%.

Racial composition as of the 2020 census
Race	Number	Percent
White	16,042	66.7%
Black or African American	837	3.5%
American Indian and Alaska Native	149	0.6%
Asian	3,506	14.6%
Native Hawaiian and Other Pacific Islander	105	0.4%
Some other race	745	3.1%
Two or more races	2,675	11.1%
