= Silver Firs, Washington =

- CDP
- Location of Silver Firs, Washington

- Coordinates: 47°51′42″N 122°08′44″W
- Country: United States
- State: Washington
- County: Snohomish

Area
  - Total: 14.0 sq mi (36.2 km^{2})
  - Land: 13.9 sq mi (36.1 km^{2})
  - Water: 0.039 sq mi (0.1 km^{2})

Population (2020)
  - Total: 22,174
  - Density: 2,686/sq mi (1,037.1/km^{2})
- Time zone: UTC-8 (Pacific (PST))
  - Summer (DST): UTC-7 (PDT)
- FIPS code: 53-63052

Silver Firs is a census-designated place (CDP) in Snohomish County, Washington, United States. The population was 22,174 at the 2020 census. It lies northeast of the city of Mill Creek. Silver Firs is one of two CDPs that were created out of the former Seattle Hill-Silver Firs CDP in 2010, the other being Eastmont.

== Geography ==
Silver Firs is located at 47°51′42″N 122°08′44″W (47.881010, -122.178697).

According to the United States Census Bureau, the CDP has a total area of 14.0 square miles (36.2 km^{2}), of which, 13.9 square miles (36.1 km^{2}) of it is land and 0.04 square miles (0.1 km^{2}) of it (0.21%) is water.

The CDP contains several large residential neighborhoods, including Silver Firs and the Highlands.

== Demographics ==
Historical population
Census	Pop.	Note	%±
1980	10,299		—
1990	24,474		137.6%
2000	35,311		44.3%
2010	20,891		−40.8%
2020	22,174		6.1%
U.S. Decennial Census; 1960 1970 1980 1990; 2000 2010; Listed as Seattle Hill-Silver Firs in the 1980, 1990, and 2000 census

A community name Seattle Hill-Silver Firs was listed as a census designated place in the 1980 U.S. census. Prior to the 2010 U.S. census, three new CDPs were split out out of its geography (Eastmont CDP, Mill Creek East CDP, Clearview CDP) and the CDP was renamed Silver Firs.

=== Racial and ethnic composition ===
Silver Firs CDP, Washington – Racial and ethnic composition Note: the US Census treats Hispanic/Latino as an ethnic category. This table excludes Latinos from the racial categories and assigns them to a separate category. Hispanics/Latinos may be of any race.
Race / Ethnicity (NH = Non-Hispanic)	Pop 2000	Pop 2010	Pop 2020	% 2000	% 2010	% 2020
White alone (NH)	29,854	15,449	14,764	84.55%	73.95%	66.58%
Black or African American alone (NH)	394	329	452	1.12%	1.57%	2.04%
Native American or Alaska Native alone (NH)	207	87	77	0.59%	0.42%	0.35%
Asian alone (NH)	2,646	2,780	3,480	7.49%	13.31%	15.69%
Native Hawaiian or Pacific Islander alone (NH)	74	38	62	0.21%	0.18%	0.28%
Other race alone (NH)	72	42	96	0.20%	0.20%	0.43%
Mixed race or Multiracial (NH)	999	881	1,632	2.83%	4.22%	7.36%
Hispanic or Latino (any race)	1,065	1,285	1,611	3.02%	6.15%	7.27%
Total	35,311	20,891	22,174	100.00%	100.00%	100.00%

=== 2020 census ===
As of the 2020 census, Silver Firs had a population of 22,174. The median age was 38.2 years. 27.3% of residents were under the age of 18 and 9.2% of residents were 65 years of age or older. For every 100 females there were 99.4 males, and for every 100 females age 18 and over there were 96.5 males age 18 and over.

99.6% of residents lived in urban areas, while 0.4% lived in rural areas.

There were 7,241 households in Silver Firs, of which 44.5% had children under the age of 18 living in them. Of all households, 71.1% were married-couple households, 10.3% were households with a male householder and no spouse or partner present, and 13.9% were households with a female householder and no spouse or partner present. About 13.1% of all households were made up of individuals and 4.4% had someone living alone who was 65 years of age or older.

There were 7,336 housing units, of which 1.3% were vacant. The homeowner vacancy rate was 0.3% and the rental vacancy rate was 3.5%.

Racial composition as of the 2020 census
Race	Number	Percent
White	15,127	68.2%
Black or African American	485	2.2%
American Indian and Alaska Native	103	0.5%
Asian	3,493	15.8%
Native Hawaiian and Other Pacific Islander	63	0.3%
Some other race	559	2.5%
Two or more races	2,344	10.6%

=== 2021 American Community Survey ===
The ACS 5-Year Estimate of 2021 for Housing and Families estimated that the population consisted of 7,384 households, and 6,061 families. 94.6% of these housing units consisted of 1-unit structures, with 90.1% of units being owner-occupied. It was estimated that 43.6% of households had children under the age of 18 living with them, 69.2% were married couples living together, 9.1% had a female householder with no husband present, and 17.9% were non-families. 44.7% of all households were estimated to have one or more people under 18 years of age, and 3.7% had someone living alone who was 65 years of age or older. The average household size was 2.99 and the average family size was 3.22.

The ACS 5-Year Estimate of 2021 for Age and Sex reported the age distribution as 25.2% under the age of 18, 7.8% from 18 to 24, 39.3% from 15 to 44, 14.13% who were 60 years of age or older, and 2.5% who were 75 years of age or older. The median age was 37.6 years overall, or 36.5 years for males and 39.3 years for females. For every 100 females, there were 108.5 males.

The ACS 5-Year Estimate of 2021 for Commuting Characteristics reported that 75.3% of residents in the CDP commuted to work via car, truck or van (with 69.0% of residents driving alone and 6.3% carpooling). 5.1% of residents were estimated to commute via public transportation, and 17.2% were estimated to work from home.

The ACS 5-Year Estimate of 2021 for Medium Income reported a median income for a household in the CDP as $137,577, and the median income for a family was $145,973. In nonfamily households, Males living alone were estimated to have a median income of $89,006, with a median income of $109,000 for all males (with a margin of error of $44,711). Females living alone were estimated to have a median income of $73,750, with a median income of $81,581 for all females (with a margin of error of $15,914).

Further ACS 5-Year Estimate data for 2021 includes:

- 95.5% Highschool graduacy rate of the population 25 years and over.
- 25.6% of the population 5 years of age or older that speaks a language other than English, with 7.2% speaking Spanish, 11.5% Asian and Pacific Island languages, 5.6% other Indo-European languages, and 1.3% other languages
- 6.5% of the population below the poverty line, including 7.9% of those under age 18, 6.0% of those between 18 and 64 years old, and 1.8% of those with a bachelor's degree or higher.
- Occupancy Characteristics of 82.1% Family Households, 12.8% Individual Households, and 5.1% Nonfamily Households of individuals not living alone, with an overall 99.1% of households with 1 or less occupants per room.
- 1.6% of households with no computer or computing devices, and 6.1% of households without an internet subscription
- 48.2% of the population being born in the state of Washington, 30.0% being born in another state in the United States, and 20.0% being born outside of the United States, with 92.4% of the population being US Citizens via place of birth or naturalization
