= Recipe for Success =

American television series

- Genre: cooking show
- Presented by: Simon Rimmer; Stink Fisher; Marlie Hall; Eric McLendon
- Country of origin: United States
- Original language: English

Production
- Producers: Victoria Bert; Nicole DeWalt; Tekella Foster; Kevin Moriarty; Al Roker
- Cinematography: Michael Clevenger; Alan Jacobsen; Anthony Rodriguez
- Editor: Michael Sellers
- Production companies: Al Roker Production; Food Network

Original release
- Network: Food Network
- Release: 2004 – present

Recipe for Success is a food reality television series that follows entrepreneurs who trade their jobs for following their dreams.

On Food Network's Canadian station, it is broadcast on Sundays at 2:30 PM. It uses the same theme song as The Next Food Network Star.

In the BBC program, the show covers a popular TV competition in which a couple takes over a restaurant they do not own for two sittings on a day in a bid to win £1,000. They are given a team of professional staff who will work to the amateurs' menus. One amateur takes on the role of Head Chef, while the other takes on the role of Front of House Manager. On the final day of the week, whoever has made the most money wins the money already won during that week. The show is presented by Simon Rimmer.
