= The Everett Clinic =

Medical practice in Washington, US

Optum Care Washington
- Formerly: The Everett Clinic
- Type: Subsidiary
- Industry: Healthcare
- Founded: 1924; 102 years ago (as The Everett Clinic)
- Headquarters: Everett, Washington, U.S.
- Key people: Imelda Dacones, MD (Market President, Optum Washington); Alka Atal-Barrio, MD (Market Chief Medical Officer, Optum WA)
- Services: Health care provider Multi-specialty Medical group
- Number of employees: ~2,500+ (TEC legacy, 2023)
- Parent: Optum (UnitedHealth Group)
- Website: www.everettclinic.com

Optum Care Washington is a multi-specialty medical group practice operating in the Puget Sound region of Washington state. It was widely known for nearly a century as The Everett Clinic, founded in 1924 in Everett, Washington. Historically, it was described by independent sources as a physician-led group recognized for quality of care and community involvement.

The organization underwent significant ownership changes starting in the mid-2010s. It merged with DaVita HealthCare Partners in 2016. Subsequently, DaVita sold its medical group division, including The Everett Clinic, to Optum, a subsidiary of UnitedHealth Group, in a deal announced in late 2017 and finalized with the clinic joining Optum in 2019. In April 2024, The Everett Clinic, along with The Polyclinic in Seattle (also part of Optum), was rebranded under the Optum Care Washington name.

Optum Care Washington operates numerous care sites across King, Pierce, Skagit, and Snohomish counties, employing hundreds of providers and serving hundreds of thousands of patients.

== History ==
=== Founding and Early Decades (1924–c. 1970s) ===
The Everett Clinic was founded in 1924 by four physicians: Samuel Caldbick, MD, Harry Secoy, MD, Arthur Gunderson, MD, and Leo Trask, MD. Its establishment occurred during Everett's post-World War I economic boom, largely driven by the lumber industry. An early strategic decision involved contracting with local mills to provide medical care for workers, an early form of managed care or prepayment plan, which provided financial stability during the Great Depression. The Everett Clinic, P.S. was formally established as a corporation on February 9, 1925. The clinic continued to grow, opening its Founders Building in Everett in 1963.

=== Expansion and Growth (c. 1980s–2015) ===
From the late 1970s through the early 2010s, The Everett Clinic experienced significant growth. The number of physicians grew from 25 in 1977 to approximately 500 providers by 2013. This period saw expansion beyond Everett into surrounding communities within Snohomish County, with new clinics opening in Marysville (1981), Harbour Pointe (Mukilteo, 1985), Lake Stevens (1987), Snohomish (1993), Silver Lake (South Everett, 1994), Stanwood (1996), and Mill Creek (2006). The Smokey Point Medical Center opened in 2012.

Services also diversified with the opening of the first walk-in clinic in Everett (1989), the Kemp Surgery Center (1997, along with the Gunderson Building), and the Trask Surgery Center (2001). The clinic participated in the Providence Regional Cancer Partnership starting in 2006 and adopted electronic medical records (EMR) in 2007, replacing paper charts.

In 1998, the clinic banned pharmaceutical company representatives from its offices, a move noted in news reports. The Everett Clinic Foundation was established in 1995 to formalize community giving.

The clinic gained recognition as a desirable workplace, including being named to national "best place to work" lists (e.g., in 2011) and featured in a 2012 PBS documentary, "U.S. Health Care: The Good News". By 2013, it was reported to be the fifth-largest private employer in Snohomish County, employing around 2,000 staff and caring for approximately 300,000 patients.

=== DaVita HealthCare Partners Merger (2016–2019) ===
Facing increasing pressures in the healthcare industry, The Everett Clinic pursued a merger, announcing intentions in September 2015 to join DaVita HealthCare Partners, a division of DaVita Inc.. Goals included financing expansion, adapting to value-based healthcare, and ensuring long-term viability.

Shareholders approved the merger in December 2015, and the transaction closed on March 1, 2016. DaVita paid a reported $405 million. The clinic's structure changed to a professional limited liability company (PLLC).

Under DaVita ownership, the clinic expanded into King County, opening clinics in Shoreline (2016), Edmonds (2017), Woodinville (2017), Kirkland (via acquisition of Totem Lake Family Medicine, 2017), and Bothell (2018). Leadership changes occurred, and a $33 million binding arbitration settlement with 31 former clinic physicians was finalized in May 2017.

=== Acquisition by Optum and Rebranding (2019–Present) ===
In December 2017, DaVita Inc. announced plans to sell its DaVita Medical Group division, including The Everett Clinic, to Optum, a subsidiary of UnitedHealth Group, for $4.9 billion, citing disappointing financial returns.

The Everett Clinic officially became part of Optum in 2019. Optum states that Optum Care Washington, PLLC remains physician-owned, with Optum providing administrative support. However, multiple independent news sources refer to the transaction as an acquisition by Optum or UnitedHealth Group.

In April 2024, Optum rebranded both The Everett Clinic and The Polyclinic as Optum Care Washington. Concurrent with the rebranding, Optum announced enhanced digital services.

Since joining Optum, the organization affiliated with additional practices in 2020. Workforce reductions were reported in August 2023. In August 2024, Optum Care Washington announced it would stop accepting certain Medicaid plans (UnitedHealthcare Community Plan) effective November 1, 2024, a decision projected to affect over 23,000 patients. The move prompted public concern and commentary regarding access and corporate influence in healthcare.

== Organization and Operations ==
=== Structure and Ownership ===
Optum Care Washington operates legally as a professional limited liability company (PLLC). According to Optum, the practice remains physician-owned, with Optum providing administrative and technological support. This structure contrasts with common reporting describing Optum/UnitedHealth Group as having acquired the clinic. The organization is described as "locally led."

=== Size and Scope ===
Optum Care Washington is a large medical group serving the Puget Sound region. Historically, The Everett Clinic served over 315,000 patients. As of 2023, the combined Optum Washington network (former Everett Clinic and Polyclinic) served approximately 660,000 patients.

The Everett Clinic legacy included around 600 employed providers, while the broader Optum Washington network includes approximately 5,400 local doctors (employed and affiliated). The Everett Clinic was historically a major employer in Snohomish County, with staff numbers cited around 2,000-2,500.

Geographically, the organization operates numerous care sites (reported as around 30 or more) across Snohomish, King, Skagit, and Pierce counties.

=== Services ===
Optum Care Washington provides a range of medical services.

- Primary Care: Including Family medicine, Internal medicine, and Pediatrics.
- Specialty Care: Offers numerous medical and surgical specialties, such as Cardiology, Dermatology, Gastroenterology, Neurology, Oncology, Orthopedics, and Urology. Behavioral health services are also listed.
- Surgical Services: Outpatient surgery is provided at dedicated centers. Specialties include Hand, Cosmetic/Facial Plastic, Mohs surgery, and Orthopedic.
- Urgent Care: Multiple walk-in clinic locations are available.
- Ancillary Services: Includes advanced imaging, laboratory services, Pharmacy, Physical therapy, hearing services, and Optometry/Optical centers.
- Virtual Care: Telemedicine options including video visits were announced with the 2024 rebranding.

=== Locations ===
Optum Care Washington operates clinics across several counties in the Puget Sound area, including Snohomish, King, Skagit, and Pierce counties. While historically centered in Everett, the organization expanded significantly over time. Notable locations in Snohomish County include clinics in Marysville, Mill Creek, Edmonds, Lake Stevens, Snohomish, Stanwood, and the Smokey Point Medical Center. Expansion into King County began notably in 2016, adding locations such as Shoreline, Kirkland (Totem Lake), Woodinville, and Bothell.

=== Affiliations ===
Optum Care Washington maintains partnerships, including a significant affiliation with Providence Regional Medical Center Everett (PRMCE). This includes collaboration in the Providence Regional Cancer Partnership and having Optum hospitalists provide inpatient care at PRMCE. Many Optum physicians hold admitting privileges at PRMCE.

Other partnerships cited include the Washington Health Alliance, the Washington State Department of Labor and Industries, the American Heart Association, and the Seattle Mariners (as exclusive primary care partner).

== Leadership ==
- Founders (1924): Samuel Caldbick, MD; Harry Secoy, MD; Arthur Gunderson, MD; Leo Trask, MD.
- Notable Past Leaders: Rick Cooper (CEO pre/post-DaVita merger), Chris Knapp (interim CEO), Aric Coffman, MD (CEO post-DaVita), Harold Dash, MD (President pre-DaVita).
- Current Leadership (approx. 2023-2024): Imelda Dacones, MD (Market President, Optum WA), Alka Atal-Barrio, MD (Market CMO, Optum WA), Iwalani Paquette (SVP Operations, Optum WA).

== Community Involvement and Recognition ==
The Everett Clinic established The Everett Clinic Foundation in 1995. It is administered by an independent board. The clinic's history page notes significant donations over time, and continued community investment was stated as a goal during the DaVita merger.

The clinic received recognition over the years, including:

- Being named one of Fortune Magazine's "100 Best Companies to Work For" (cited in DaVita press releases).
- Recognition as a state and national "best place to work" (reported in news media).
- National recognition for quality of care and cost management.
- Being featured in the 2012 PBS documentary "U.S. Health Care: The Good News".

== Controversies ==
The transitions to ownership by DaVita and subsequently Optum/UnitedHealth Group have been associated with several controversies and criticisms reported by reliable sources.

- Impact of Acquisitions: Concerns have been raised by observers and former associates about the loss of local control and the potential impact of corporate ownership on patient care priorities and physician autonomy, suggesting a shift towards a model more influenced by profit motives.
- Medicaid Contract Changes: Optum Care Washington's 2024 decision to terminate its contract with the UnitedHealthcare Community Plan (Medicaid/Apple Health), impacting over 23,000 patients, drew criticism regarding access for low-income populations, particularly given parent company UHG's revenues. This followed earlier reported contract disputes with Premera Blue Cross.
- Staffing Reductions: Layoffs affecting employees at former Everett Clinic and Polyclinic sites were reported in August 2023.
- Physician Settlement: A $33 million binding arbitration settlement with 31 former clinic physicians related to the DaVita merger was reported in 2017.

These events highlight tensions between the operational and financial goals of a large national healthcare corporation and the historical practices and community relationships of a long-standing regional medical group.
