= McAleer Creek =

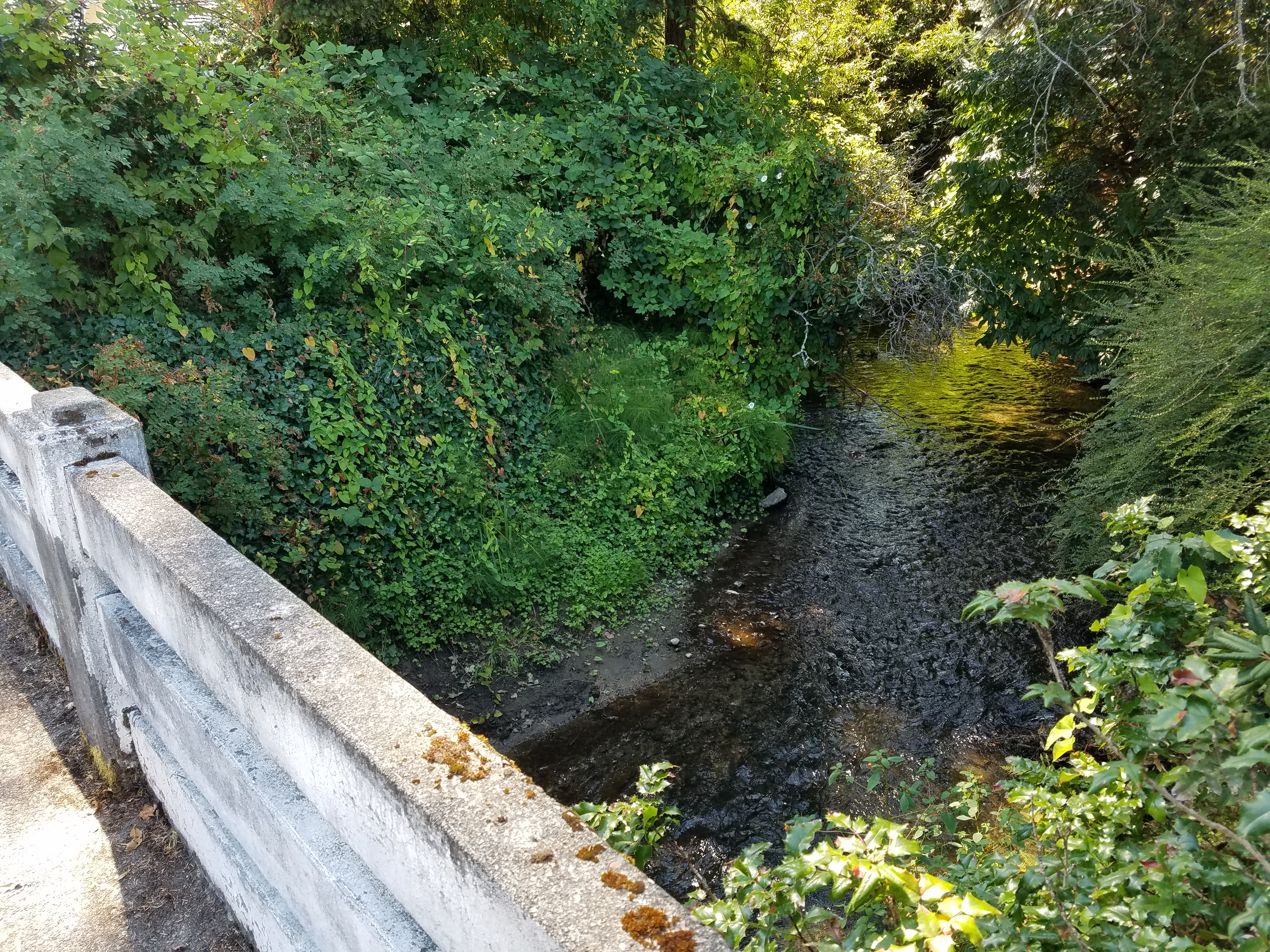

- Location of the mouth of McAleer Creek in Washington McAleer Creek (the United States)

Location
- Country: United States
- State: Washington
- Region: King County; Snohomish County

Physical characteristics
- Source: Lake Ballinger
  - location: Mountlake Terrace, Washington
  - coordinates: 47°46′51″N 122°19′25″W
- Mouth: Lake Washington
  - location: Lake Forest Park, Washington
  - coordinates: 47°44′59″N 122°16′41″W

McAleer Creek is an urban creek approximately six miles long, flowing from Lake Ballinger in southern Snohomish County to Lake Washington. It drains an approximately 8.9-square-mile (23 km^{2}) watershed. It is a salmon-bearing stream that also provides habitat to cutthroat trout, as well as watering a series of riparian areas, mostly in Lake Forest Park.

McAleer Creek has the name of Hugh McAleer, a pioneer landowner.

== Course ==
McAleer Creek rises on the southeast side of Lake Ballinger and for its whole course runs generally southeast. It first flows through Nile Golf Course in Mountlake Terrace. It enters a culvert under Interstate 5 and emerges into the Lake Forest Park flood control system. It then flows through residential streets and a wooded ravine until it passes under Perkins Way, where it joins Whisper Creek as the latter flows southward. The stream emerges into the woods once again, following Perkins and later 180th Street Northeast, entering another culvert to flow under 178th Street Northeast. It opens once more as it flows into Blue Heron Park, then moving under Bothell Way into a series of weirs and fish ladders. The stream then empties into Lake Washington near the intersection of 168th Street Northeast and Shore Drive.

== Ecology ==
McAleer Creek supports the habitat of numerous locally important bird and fish species. Birds nesting in the stream's canyon include hawks, kingfishers, and herons, and fish it bears include salmon, trout, and bass. Many segments of the creek's route are shaded, benefiting the fish, but others are open to the sun and subject to overheating.

One of McAleer Creek's greatest environmental challenges is erosion and the associated transportation of sediments. Besides the threat turbidity poses to fish, this issue has also caused serious property damage. The most notable incident was a landslide in 1981, when an eroded bluff collapsed into the stream, blocking it until it was cleared by volunteers. Between 1979 and 2004, however, the amount of total suspended solids in the water decreased.

The stream has additional issues with low dissolved oxygen levels and high fecal coliform bacterial counts. In 2012, the Washington Department of Ecology cited McAleer Creek as violating its standards for these two water quality measures. The fecal bacteria count is usually elevated by septic system spills and pet waste.

== See also ==
- List of rivers in Washington
- Lake Ballinger
