= Everett Public Library =

Public library in Washington State, United States

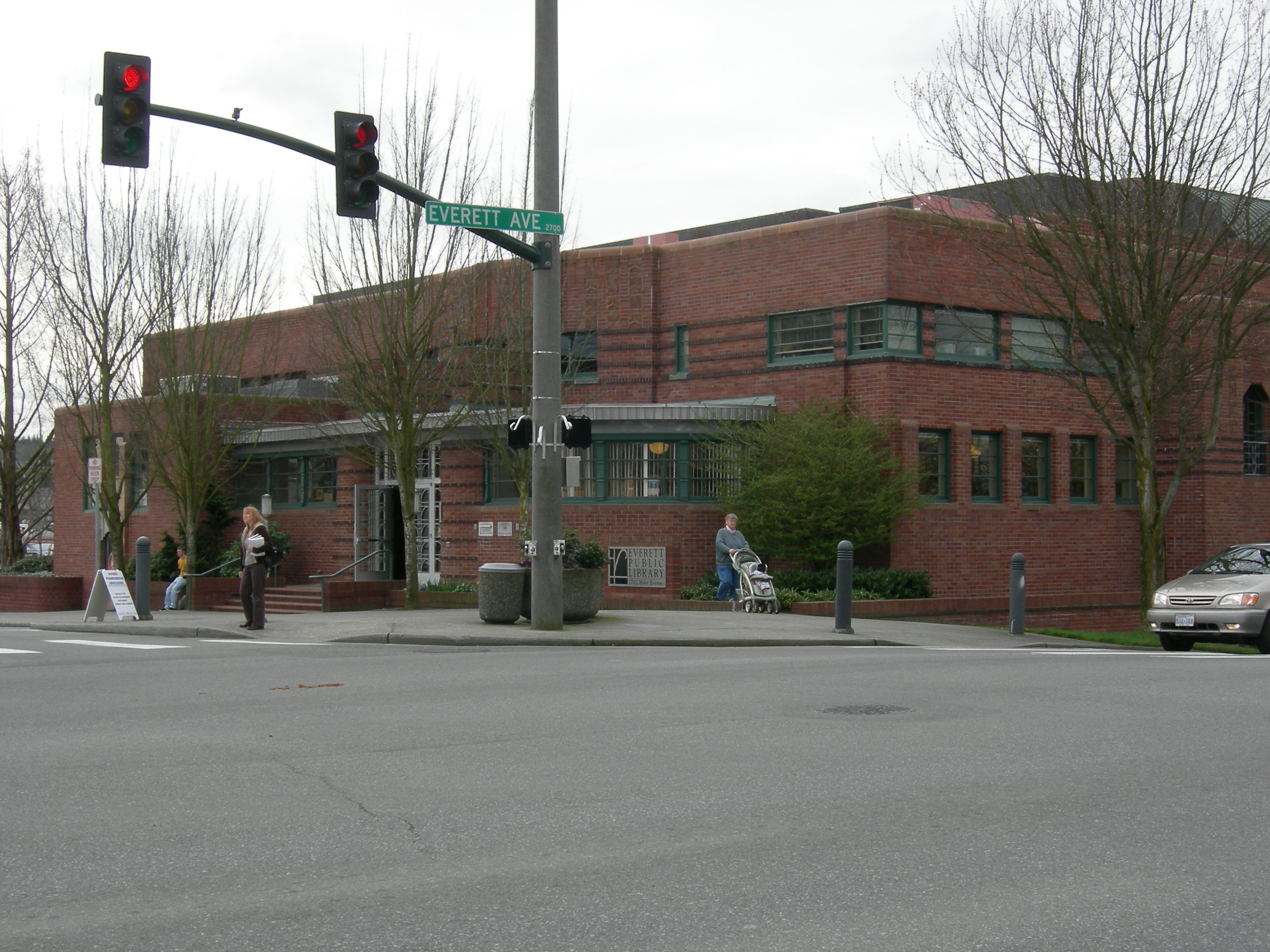
- Main Branch in Downtown Everett
- 47°58′55″N 122°12′39″W
- Location: Everett, Washington, US
- Type: Public library
- Established: June 10, 1894
- Branches: 2

Collection
- Size: 196,354 items

Access and use
- Circulation: 665,536
- Population served: 114,800
- Members: 39,252

Other information
- Director: Abigail Cooley
- Employees: 39
- Website: epls.org

The Everett Public Library (EPL) is a municipal public library system that serves Everett, Washington, United States. It has two locations: the Main Branch in Downtown Everett and the Evergreen Branch in southern Everett. EPL circulates over 600,000 items per year, provides book and media collections, reference services, on-line resources, in-home library services, and programs for adults, children and families. The library's staff includes specialists in adult reference, children's books, and local history. It is separate from the Sno-Isle Libraries system, which serves most of Snohomish County.

The library system was established in 1894 by a women's book club and later became a city department. A Carnegie library was opened in 1905 and was followed by a bookmobile in 1924, the first of its kind in Washington state and second in the Western United States. The Main Branch moved to a new building in 1934 that overlooks Puget Sound and the southern end of Whidbey Island. It has noteworthy artworks from Dudley Pratt, Ransom Patrick, Guy Anderson, Jack Gunter, and Sonja Blomdahl. The Evergreen Branch opened in 1985 to serve suburban areas of Everett.

== History ==
The Main Branch's vault-ceilinged main reading room

Everett was incorporated in 1893, but its initial growth was quickly halted by the financial crisis that year. The Everett Public Library was created on June 10, 1894, by the Everett Woman's Book Club. On that day a group of local women met in the home of Mary Lincoln Brown to form the Book Club that would have as its aim the "improvement of the mind through the study of literature", but more specifically, the establishment of a public library. Interest in forming a library partly came about due to the lack of reading material for patients at Everett General Hospital, which was noticed by some of the club's members that were involved with the hospital's establishment.

The initial collection of 1,000 books was donated by members of women's clubs across the country. Gathering books and petitioning City Council when funds were scarce, the Everett Woman's Book Club set up a temporary library in the home of a member, with the city offering them three rooms in City Hall in 1898; service began on April 21 of that year. The Club continued to work for permanent quarters, next moving to a small building, and in 1905 the Everett Public Library became a Carnegie library after it received a $25,000 Carnegie grant to design an official library for the city of Everett.

Everett started the first bookmobile service in Washington state, and the second in the West in 1924. Nicknamed Pegasus, the Model T Ford remained in service until 1950. In 1992 the library re-acquired the vehicle, and began restoring it to as close to its original condition as possible. Pegasus briefly participated in Fourth of July parades and other community events, and was able to lay claim to being the world's oldest extant bookmobile; it currently resides in City storage. Bookmobile services continued using a range of different vehicles until 2014, when the library had to eliminate its outreach department due to budget cuts.

By 1930, Everett had outgrown the Carnegie building, but with the Great Depression there was little hope of a new building. Industrialist Leonard Howarth left a bequest to the city which was used to erect a new $100,000 library at 2702 Hoyt Avenue. Seattle architect Carl F. Gould designed the facility, which opened October 3, 1934. The original Carnegie building, located at 3001 Oakes Avenue, later became a funeral parlor, the Snohomish County executive offices, and served other county functions. It is currently the home of the Carnegie Resource Center for social services. The 1905 building is listed on the National Register of Historic Places.

In 1962, the library expanded, doubling its shelving capacity. In 1981 an anonymous donor gave the library $75,000 to computerize its circulation, cataloging, and inventory systems. The Evergreen Branch opened on April 24, 1985, to expand access to library services for residents in the southern neighborhoods of Everett and relieve demand on the Main Branch in Downtown Everett. Funding was approved in 1987 to add 20,000 square feet (1,900 m^{2}) to the Main Library. The expansion of the Main Library was completed in 1991. This expansion was designed by the Cardwell/Thomas Architects and B. Craig Thompson of Dykeman Architects and inspired by the Suzzallo Library on the University of Washington campus in Seattle. Its design won an award from the American Institute of Architects. Except for some exterior renovation, the building remains largely unchanged, at 54,985 sq ft (5,108.3 m^{2}), shelving capacity for 250,000 volumes and a parking garage that can hold 115 vehicles. The Everett Public Library retained two full-time history specialists on staff, a rarity among public libraries in the United States. Northwest Room co-founders Margaret Riddle and David Dilgard retired in the 2010s.

The Everett Public Library opened its borrowing privileges to members of the Sno-Isle Libraries system, which serves most of Island and Snohomish counties, in 2015. It completed a reciprocal agreement with Sno-Isle that had allowed Everett residents to use their system without fees. The Evergreen Branch closed on December 24, 2018, for an extensive renovation that added 5,600 square feet (520 m^{2}) of interior space. It reopened on December 6, 2019, with a distinctive rocket ship sculpture unveiled outside its entrance. The library system temporarily closed in March 2020 in response to the COVID-19 pandemic and reopened for curbside pickup in June. Both locations reopened for in-person services in March 2021. The Everett city government had major budget issues in the 2020s that prompted a proposal to merge the Everett Public Library system with Sno-Isle Libraries to redistribute funding. It was opposed by the board of trustees and not forwarded for a wider public vote in 2024. The library system faced a 12 percent budget cut for 2025 that resulted in closures on Mondays and other days on alternating weeks.

== Collections ==
The Everett Public Library has several digital collections that encompass the city's history. These include images from The Everett Herald, materials related to the Everett massacre, Sanborn insurance maps, and documentation for local cemeteries. The collection also comprises photographs from local photographers and studios that were donated to the library, as well as writings from author John Patric and oral histories from long-time Everett residents.

== Administration ==
The library system is funded by the Everett city government but is governed by a separate board of trustees that meets on a monthly basis. The board has five members who are appointed by the mayor of Everett and confirmed by the city council. A director is hired by the board to manage the system. The Everett Public Library system had a budget of $5.2 million and a staff of 31.30 full-time equivalent employees in 2025.

=== Directors ===
- Alice McFarland (later Alice Duryee), 1898–1900
- Gretchen Hathaway, 1900–1907
- Jessie B. Judd, Interim Librarian, 1907
- Adelaide E. Wharton, 1907–1914
- Mary Frank, 1914–1916
- Elizabeth Topping, 1916–1919
- Mabel Ashley, 1919–1946
- Fred M. Stephen, 1946–1949
- Phil Blodgett, 1949–1973
- Gary Strong, 1973–1976
- Victoire Grassl, Interim director, 1976–1977
- Mark Nesse, 1977–2007
- Eileen Simmons, (a Library Journal 2007 Mover & Shaker) 2007–2017
- Abigail Cooley, 2017–present
