= Mountlake Terrace station =

Light rail station in Washington state, U.S.

41 Mountlake Terrace
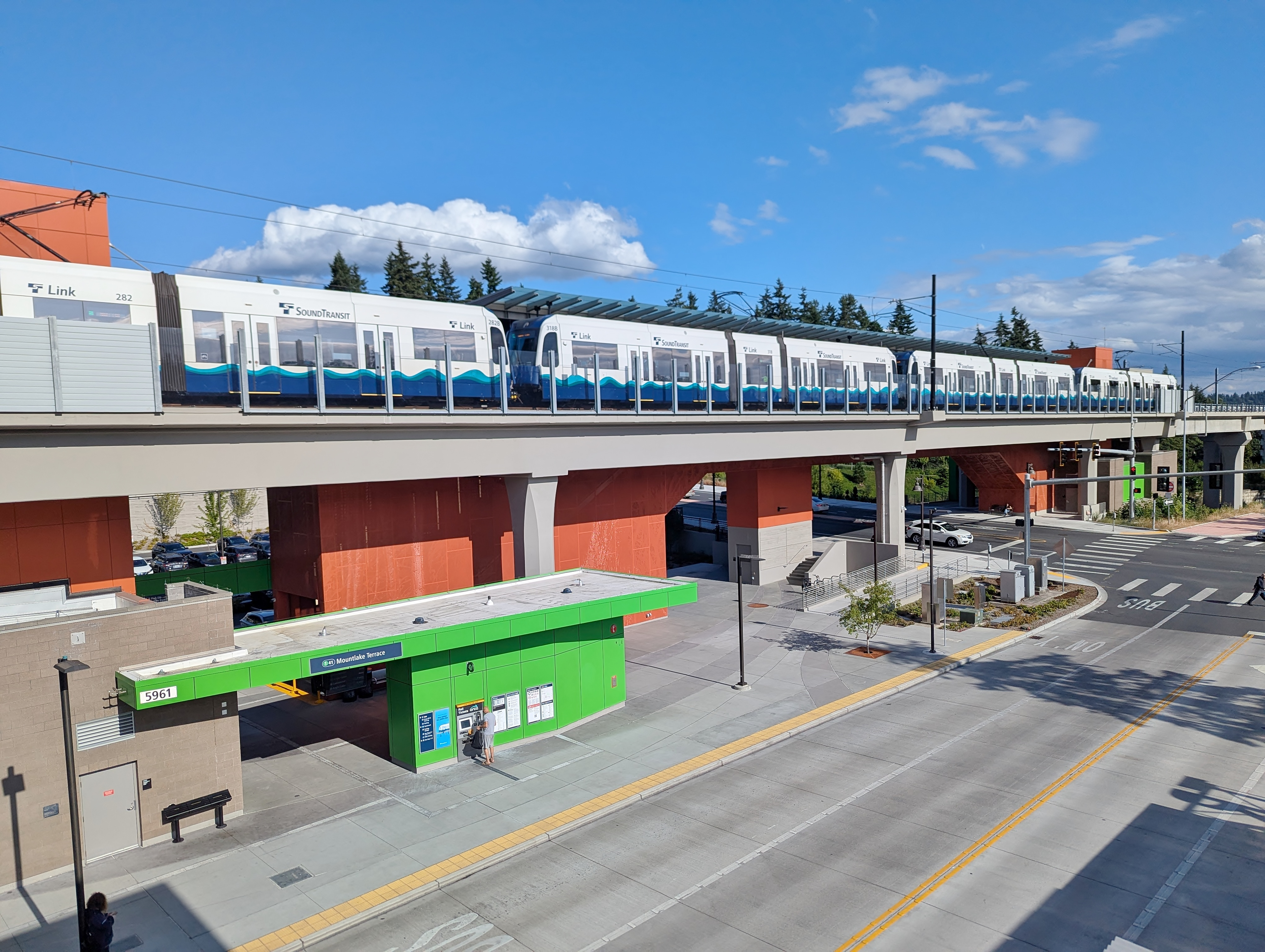
- View of the platform and north entrance from the parking garage

General information
- Location: 6001 236th Street Southwest; Mountlake Terrace, Washington; United States
- Coordinates: 47°47′08″N 122°18′53″W
- System: Link light rail
- Owner: Sound Transit; Washington State Department of Transportation
- Platforms: 1 island platform
- Tracks: 2
- Train operators: Sound Transit
- Bus routes: 7
- Bus stands: 6
- Bus operators: Community Transit; King County Metro; Sound Transit Express

Construction
- Structure type: Elevated
- Parking: 891 parking spaces
- Cycle facilities: Bicycle lockers and racks
- Accessible: Yes

History
- Opened: February 23, 2009 (buses); August 30, 2024 (light rail)
- Rebuilt: 2019–2024

Passengers
- 1,612 daily weekday boardings (2025); 529,958 total boardings (2025)

Services
Preceding station	Sound Transit	Following station
Link
Lynnwood City Center Terminus	1 Line	Shoreline North/185th toward Federal Way Downtown
Lynnwood City Center Terminus	2 Line	Shoreline North/185th toward Downtown Redmond
Location

Mountlake Terrace station is a light rail and bus station in Mountlake Terrace, Washington, United States. It is served by the 1 Line and 2 Line of Sound Transit's Link light rail system, which connects Snohomish County to Seattle and other areas of King County. The elevated station comprises a single platform, a parking garage and lot with 891 total stalls, and seven bus bays that are served by Community Transit, King County Metro, and Sound Transit Express. The bus station includes two bays in the median of Interstate 5 that are connected to the parking garage by a pedestrian bridge.

The original park-and-ride lot at the site, near Interstate 5 and 236th Street Southwest, was opened by Community Transit in April 1983. It primarily served commuter routes to Downtown Seattle and regularly reached capacity by the following decade. A parking garage and larger transit center opened on February 23, 2009, and the median bus bays on Interstate 5 were completed in March 2011. Plans to build a light rail station at the park-and-ride were approved by voters in the 2008 Sound Transit 2 package as part of the Lynnwood Link Extension. Construction began in 2019 and the station opened on August 30, 2024.

== Location ==
The station straddles 236th Street Southwest on the east side of Interstate 5 in Mountlake Terrace, a city in the Snohomish County on its border with King County. Mountlake Terrace station has a parking garage and bus loop on the north side of 236th Street Southwest. It is southwest of downtown Mountlake Terrace and adjacent to Veterans Memorial Park, which separates the station from the civic center campus. The Mountlake Terrace city government began to encourage transit-oriented development around the future station and in their city center as early as 2007 to prepare for population growth.

The former site of the Evergreen Elementary School just south of the station was redeveloped into three residential buildings with 600 apartments and retail spaces. Construction began in 2018 and was completed by 2024 with the buildings connected by a new street, named Van Ry Boulevard. A large lot to the east of the station and bus loop, used for construction staging and temporary parking, is planned to have a pair of eight-story buildings with 425 total rental units. The city government adopted plans to develop a "town center" in the older downtown area east of the light rail station in 2019. By 2024, the town center had several new residential buildings as a result of the transit-oriented development plan.

== History ==
The first transit facility in Mountlake Terrace was a 400-stall park and ride lot at Interstate 5 and 236th Street Southwest that opened on April 13, 1983. It was constructed by Community Transit to serve two local routes and King County Metro commuter buses to Downtown Seattle. The park and ride, the fourth of its kind in Snohomish County, was partially funded by the Federal Highway Administration and the Washington State Department of Transportation (WSDOT). Metro service ceased in June 1989 and was replaced by Community Transit's own commuter routes. By 1988, the park and ride lot regularly reached capacity and resulted in commuters' vehicles parked on neighborhood streets.

Community Transit began to lease parking lots at three nearby churches to provide overflow capacity for the Mountlake Terrace park and ride in 1991. Later in the decade, Community Transit proposed the construction of a parking garage at the lot as part of a program to increase park and ride capacity along the Interstate 5 corridor in Snohomish County. City officials proposed a mixed-use development with housing and retail integrated into the garage, but later dropped those elements from the plans. A five-story garage with 652 stalls, an adjoining surface lot, and transit center were approved with a budget of $19.4 million funded primarily by the Federal Transit Administration. Construction began in December 2007 with the closure of the existing lower lot, which was replaced by spaces leased from a local church and grocery store. An integrated flyer stop in the median of Interstate 5 was included in plans for the parking garage to allow Sound Transit Express buses to serve Mountlake Terrace.

The parking garage at Mountlake Terrace Transit Center, opened in 2009

Mountlake Terrace Transit Center was dedicated on February 20, 2009, and opened three days later with two bays for bus routes. The parking garage was built with recycled materials and includes two elevators, 32 solar panels on its façade, and a stream that was daylighted during construction. It also has glass art created by local high school students under the direction of artist Jerry Newcomb. The existing surface lot to the east of the bus bays was later refurbished using funding from the American Recovery and Reinvestment Act of 2009. Construction of the freeway flyer stop, named the Mountlake Terrace Freeway Station, began in May 2009 and cost $35.4 million with funding primarily from Sound Transit as part of the regional transit system. It opened on March 20, 2011, and served by Sound Transit Express and Community Transit commuter routes connecting Snohomish County to Downtown Seattle. The median flyer stop was first proposed in a 1996 report by Sound Transit and WSDOT to serve buses without leaving the freeway's high-occupancy vehicle lanes. It sustained fire damage on April 21, 2026, when a car crashed into the northbound concrete elevator shaft and caught fire; the sole occupant, a 43-year-old male from Ferndale, was declared dead at the scene by emergency response crews.

=== Light rail planning ===
A plan for a rapid transit line between Seattle and Everett was published by the Seattle Transit System in 1957 and proposed to use the right-of-way reserved for Interstate 5, which had not been completed. It included Ballinger station, named for Lake Ballinger, at Northeast 205th Street on the King–Snohomish county line to serve Mountlake Terrace. The state government determined that it would be unable to purchase additional right-of-way for a transit project using funding allocated for highway projects, which led to the proposal being shelved. The Interstate 5 corridor between Seattle and Lynnwood remained the focus of later transit plans and studies in the 1980s, which proposed to use light rail trains and a station in Mountlake Terrace. A 1986 study by Metro Transit and the Puget Sound Council of Governments resulted in an endorsement to build several light rail corridors, among them a Seattle–Lynnwood line with a stop in Mountlake Terrace. SNO-TRAN, a county planning agency, recommended stations in the freeway median at 236th Street Southwest and on the west side of the 220th Street Southwest interchange.

The Regional Transit Authority (now Sound Transit) was formed in 1993 to further develop a light rail plan that would be presented to voters for final approval. Although the plan included a light rail line between Seattle and Lynnwood, the Mountlake Terrace city government requested their station be deferred until a final decision on a site could be made. The city council had considered an endorsement of a station near the county line or at 236th Street Southwest, but the latter drew criticism from local residents. The transit plan was rejected by voters in March 1995, but a scaled-back version was approved in November 1996 that would leave the northern corridor for a future expansion. Sound Transit adopted long-range plans to extend Link light rail service from Northgate in Seattle to Snohomish County along Interstate 5; the garage and flyer stop at Mountlake Terrace Transit Center were designed to be adapted for potential use by trains.

The Seattle–Lynnwood corridor was among the shortlist of projects studied in 2005 by Sound Transit for a future regional transit package, along with further light rail extensions to Everett along either Interstate 5 or State Route 99. One of the studied concepts for the package would have truncated service at Mountlake Terrace, but it was shelved in favor of a Lynnwood terminus. The regional ballot measure, named Sound Transit 2, was initially combined with highway projects to form the Roads and Transit ballot measure, which was rejected by voters in November 2007. A transit-only version with fewer projects was approved in November 2008. The Lynnwood Link Extension through Mountlake Terrace and Lynnwood, along either Interstate 5, State Route 99, or 15th Avenue Northeast, was scheduled to open in 2023. The cost of the project was estimated $1.5 billion (in year-of-expenditure dollars) with local funding planned to be raised primarily within Snohomish County.

Sound Transit evaluated several routing alternatives, primarily on Interstate 5 and State Route 99, with stations that would serve the existing Mountlake Terrace Transit Center. The favored option on State Route 99 would have required two right-angle turns on State Route 104 to reach Mountlake Terrace; other options would have bypassed Mountlake Terrace altogether. The Interstate 5 corridor was chosen by the Sound Transit board of directors for further development and environmental review in December 2011. Four alternatives for Mountlake Terrace station were presented in the draft environmental impact statement, of which three were located east of the parking garage and one utilized the flyer stop in the freeway median. In November 2013, the board of directors chose the eastern station placement option in their preferred alternative for the Lynnwood Link project. The Lynnwood Link route was formally approved in April 2015 with an elevated station that straddles 236th Street Southwest to serve the Mountlake Terrace Transit Center. An option to build a second station in Mountlake Terrace, to the north at 220th Street Southwest, was included if future funding became available.

Mountlake Terrace was adopted as the permanent name for the station in July 2017; the other finalist was Ballinger. During final design of the station, the Mountlake Terrace city council threatened to withhold planning approval unless additional parking capacity was provided during construction by Sound Transit. The existing parking facilities at the transit center had regularly reached its full capacity of 890 vehicles by 7:25 a.m. in the morning on weekdays. Sound Transit agreed to build a temporary parking lot adjacent to the transit center but would not permanently expand capacity at the station. A series of design modifications to reduce a $500 million cost overrun for the project were approved in 2018; at Mountlake Terrace station, the exit stairs were narrowed and the decorative masonry was replaced with other materials. The final public hearing for the design of Mountlake Terrace station was held in June 2019. Community Transit transferred ownership of the transit center's parking garage to WSDOT in September 2020; it is planned to be transferred to Sound Transit in 2026 as part of a full acquisition of the station site.

=== Light rail construction ===
Platform construction in October 2021, viewed from the parking garage

Construction along the future light rail route through Mountlake Terrace began in early 2019 with the removal of Douglas fir trees that were later replaced by new plantings. The surface parking lot at the transit center was closed in October to prepare for construction staging at the future station. It was replaced by a vacant supermarket in downtown Mountlake Terrace that was leased by Sound Transit to provide 235 parking spaces for up to two years. The supermarket lot was served by local Community Transit buses as well as a special shuttle during peak periods. General contractor Skanska was awarded a $778 million contract for the Mountlake Terrace and Lynnwood section of the light rail project in December 2019.

Most work was halted in April 2020 during a statewide stay-at-home order during the early stages of the COVID-19 pandemic, but resumed within a few weeks. A five-month closure of the Mountlake Terrace Freeway Station began in July 2020 to create a work zone for the light rail overpass that would cross Interstate 5 north of the station. Commuter routes bypassed the flyer stop and a temporary fare-free route to Downtown Seattle was operated by Sound Transit until the stops reopened on November 29.

Construction of the falsework at Mountlake Terrace station began in September 2020 alongside an ancillary building on the east side of the bus bays. The first girders supporting the elevated platform were erected the following month. The main bus bays at the transit center were closed in March 2021 and replaced with a temporary bus loop to the east of the construction site. A cul-de-sac with nine homes was demolished for the temporary facility, which also included a parking lot with 230 stalls. The pouring of concrete foundations for the stairwells, elevators, and escalators at the station began in June 2021. Construction was declared substantially complete in late 2023.

The new main bus loop opened on March 30, 2024. Light rail service on the 1 Line at Mountlake Terrace station began on August 30, 2024. The 2 Line entered simulated service on February 14, 2026, with passengers able to board trains from Lynnwood to International District/Chinatown station.

== Station layout ==
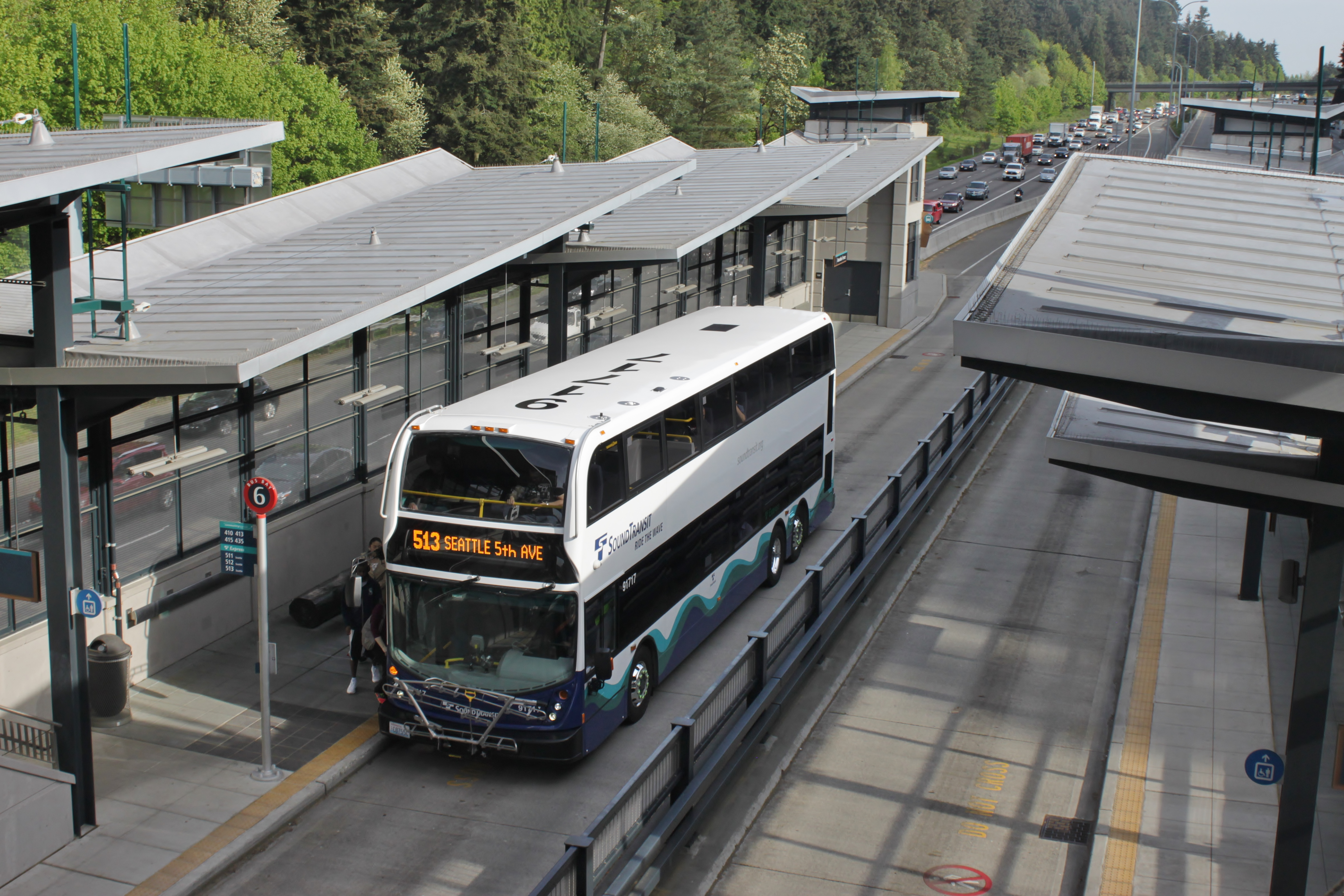
The Mountlake Terrace Freeway Station, a flyer stop in the median of Interstate 5 served by express buses

The elevated island platform for Mountlake Terrace station straddles 236th Street Southwest on the east side of its interchange with Interstate 5. The outer sides of the tracks have clear barriers that act as shields from wind and rain. The station has two entrances on opposite sides of 236th Street Southwest: Exit A at the north end, adjacent to bus bays and the parking garage; and Exit B to the south near Van Ry Boulevard. The two entrances include ticket vending machines and rider information at the plaza level and are connected to the elevated platform by stairs, escalators, and elevators; Exit A also has a public restroom. Mountlake Terrace station has 891 total parking stalls in two facilities near the north entrance: a five-story parking garage with 668 stalls to the west and 223 in a surface lot to the east.

The station has seven bus bays that serve local and express buses. Three bays are on 236th Street Southwest, two are adjacent to Exit A and the parking garage, and two bays in a flyer stop for express buses are in the median of Interstate 5 at the Mountlake Terrace Freeway Station. The flyer stop is connected to the rest of the complex by a pedestrian bridge to the third floor of the parking garage, which has elevator access. Buses that use the local bays continue through a one-way street and layover zone that connects to 236th Street Southwest and Van Ry Boulevard. The station has 16 bicycle lockers and 30 racks at its plaza level. A pedestrian path through Veterans Memorial Park, opened in 2026, connects the station to Mountlake Terrace's city hall and library.

Mountlake Terrace station was designed by HNTB. It primarily uses earth-toned brown, green, and blue to match with the area's surrounding tree cover. From the station, the light rail tracks continue north and cross over Interstate 5 on a curved bridge that used a mix of precast and cast-in-place concrete. As part of Sound Transit's public art program, Kipp Kobayashi was commissioned to create a mural on the metal panels under the platform that hang over the entrances and plazas. The mural, named Re-Forestation, depicts the roots of a large tree using perforations within the metal sheet. The Mountlake Terrace Freeway Station has a piece named In The Still Point, which comprises a cast bronze sculpture that resembles a felled tree and a series of tree rings.

== Services ==
The station is served by the 1 Line and 2 Line, both part of the Link light rail system. Mountlake Terrace is the first southbound station from Lynnwood City Center, the northern terminus of both lines; Shoreline North/185th station is the next stop to the south. It is the twenty-fifth station from Federal Way Downtown, the southern terminus of the 1 Line, and the twenty-fourth from Downtown Redmond, the eastern terminus of the 2 Line. Link light rail trains serve Mountlake Terrace station 20 hours a day on weekdays and Saturdays, from 5:00 a.m. to 12:00 a.m.; and 18 hours on Sundays, from 6:00 a.m. to 12:00 a.m. During regular weekday service, trains on each line operate roughly every eight minutes during rush hour, ten minutes during midday operation, and twelve to fifteen minutes in the early morning and at night. On weekends, trains on each line arrive at Mountlake Terrace station every ten minutes during midday hours and every twelve to fifteen minutes during mornings and evenings. The two lines combine for frequencies of four minutes during rush hour and five minutes during midday and weekend service. The station is approximately 27 minutes from Westlake station in Downtown Seattle, 54 minutes from Bellevue Downtown station, and 65 minutes from SeaTac/Airport station. In 2025, an average of 1,612 passengers boarded Link trains at Mountlake Terrace station on weekdays.

Mountlake Terrace station is a major hub for bus routes in the city and surrounding areas with local service from Community Transit and King County Metro. The Mountlake Terrace Freeway Station has two bays that are served by a Sound Transit Express route from Downtown Seattle to Everett during rush hour. During disruptions to Link service, a bus shuttle is operated between stations; it stops at the Mountlake Terrace Freeway Station bays. Community Transit's local routes connect the station to downtown Mountlake Terrace, Aurora Village, Edmonds, Brier, Lynnwood, and Alderwood Mall. An express route connects Mountlake Terrace station directly to Edmonds station and the city's ferry terminal, served by a Washington State Ferries route. King County Metro operates two routes from the station to Shoreline, Lake Forest Park, and Kenmore. Until 2026, the agency also operated its microtransit service, Metro Flex, in a zone that included Mountlake Terrace station.
