= Premera Blue Cross =

U.S. Pacific Northwest health insurance company

- Type: Not-for-profit organization
- Industry: Health Insurance
- Predecessor: Washington Hospital Service, Medical Service Corporation, Blue Cross of Washington and Alaska
- Founded: 1933
- Headquarters: Mountlake Terrace, Washington, United States
- Area served: Alaska and Washington
- Products: Health Insurance
- Number of employees: 3,200
- Parent: Blue Cross Blue Shield Association
- Subsidiaries: LifeWise of Washington; LifeWise Assurance Company; Calypso Healthcare Solutions; Vivacity; Connexion Insurance (formally Ucentris)
- Website: www.premera.com

Premera Blue Cross is a not-for-profit Blue Cross Blue Shield licensed health insurance company based in Mountlake Terrace, Washington, United States. It sells health insurance plans under the Blue Cross license in Washington state except Clark County and under both of the Blue Cross and Blue Shield licenses in Alaska.

The company provides health insurance and related services to approximately 2 million people. Premera Blue Cross has operated in Washington since 1945, and in Alaska since 1957. Premera Blue Cross is an independent licensee of the Blue Cross Blue Shield Association.

== History ==
Premera was founded as Washington Hospital Service in 1933, and began operating in Alaska in 1957. In 1969, the company's name was changed to Blue Cross of Washington and Alaska.

In June 1998, Blue Cross of Washington and Alaska merged with Spokane's Medical Service Corporation under the name Premera Blue Cross.

In 2002, Premera's executives first informed Washington commissioner Mike Kreidler of their intent to convert from a non-profit to a for-profit joint-stock company. After five years, the request was officially ended on March 5, 2007.

In October 2009, Premera waived deductible or co-pay for 2009-H1N1 vaccine fees for its fully insured members.

On February 9, 2012 the Seattle Times published an article alleging non-profit insurance outfits, including Regence, Premera and Group Health, were stockpiling billions of dollars in reserves while increasing their rates at the same time.

In October 2014, Jeff Roe replaced Gubby Barlow as CEO of Premera.

On May 5, 2015, Premera experienced a security breach, possibly leaking the private information of 11 million of its members. On July 11, 2019, Premera reached a settlement to pay $10.4 million over its failure to secure sensitive consumer data following the breach in 2015.

In 2019, the company's board, according to the NAIC Quarterly Statement, included Connie Renee Collingsworth, a member of the leadership team of the Bill & Melinda Gates Foundation and John E. Jenrette, an executive at Cedars-Sinai.

In response to the COVID-19 crisis in 2020, Premera offered advance payments to health care providers amounting up to $100 million.
