= Brier, Washington =

Brier
- City
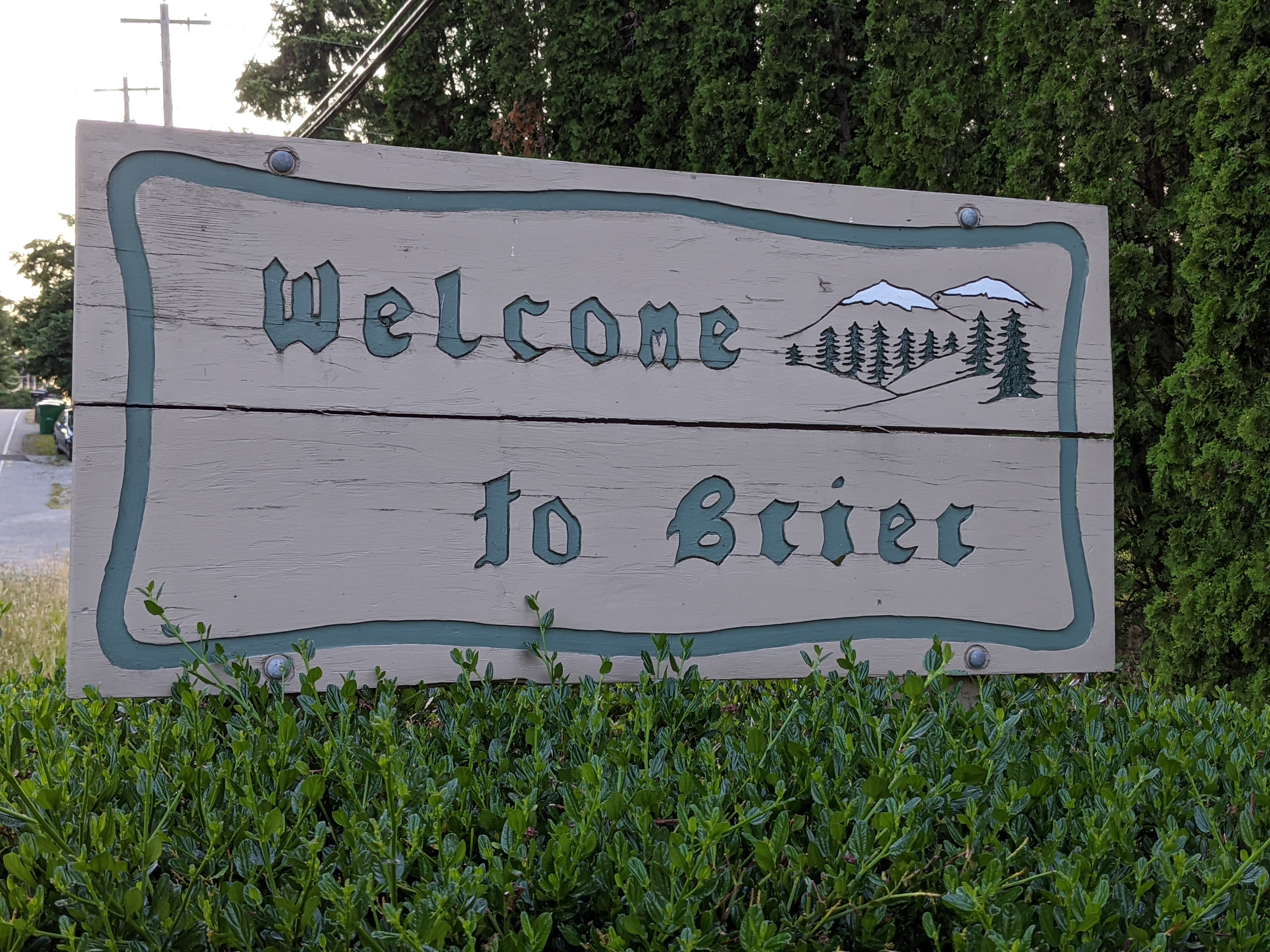
- Interactive map of Brier
- Coordinates: 47°47′04″N 122°16′28″W
- Country: United States
- State: Washington
- County: Snohomish
- Founded: 1883
- Incorporated: February 11, 1965

Government
  - Type: Mayor–council
  - Mayor: Dale Kaemingk

Area
  - Total: 2.20 sq mi (5.69 km^{2})
  - Land: 2.20 sq mi (5.69 km^{2})
  - Water: 0 sq mi (0.00 km^{2})
- Elevation: 420 ft (128 m)

Population (2020)
  - Total: 6,560
  - Estimate (2022): 6,463
  - Density: 3,173.4/sq mi (1,225.24/km^{2})
- Time zone: UTC-8 (Pacific (PST))
  - Summer (DST): UTC-7 (PDT)
- ZIP code: 98036
- Area code: 425
- FIPS code: 53-07940
- GNIS feature ID: 1512029
- Website: ci.brier.wa.us

Brier is a city in Snohomish County, Washington, United States. It is bordered by Mountlake Terrace to the west, Lynnwood to the north, Bothell to the east, and Lake Forest Park to the south. The population was 6,560 at the 2020 census.

== History ==
Brier is located in the traditional territory of several Coast Salish peoples, including the Sammamish, Snohomish, and Suquamish. The area around modern-day Swamp Creek was known as dxʷɬ(ə)q̓ ab, meaning "other side of something" and "a wide place", in the Lushootseed language.

The first European-descendant settlers in the Brier area, the Salty family, arrived from Finland in 1883 and constructed a cabin to establish a Homestead Act claim. They were followed by loggers who cleared land that had already been sold to the founders of the Puget Mill Company. The first area school was built on land donated by the Salty family in September 1896 and later replaced with the Cedar Valley School in 1911. By 1915, much of the forestland around modern-day Brier was cleared.

The Brier area was known for its mink farms and later gave way to suburban ranch houses in the 1950s and 1960s. The Shasta Park subdivision was created in 1924 and further developed into smaller lots by the early 1950s. Brier was named for an existing road that bisected the subdivision where the community was developed in the 1950s.

Brier was officially incorporated as a city on February 11, 1965, after an emergency vote following a proposal from a developer to annex the area into neighboring Mountlake Terrace. Boeing engineer Richard Balser was elected as the city's first mayor and the first city hall was in the home of a local resident who rented a room to the city government for $50 per month. Brier gained approximately 1,000 residents within ten years and opened its permanent city hall and public library in 1974; a city park opened in 1976 as part of the national bicentennial celebrations. The area was gradually developed into a more suburban community, growing to over 6,000 people by 1999. Since its incorporation, several elected officials in Brier have been recalled or forced to resign over various misconduct allegations and convictions. A new city hall opened in April 2005, replacing a leased office.

== Geography ==
Brier is located 15 miles (24 km) north of Seattle in southern Snohomish County, bordered to the south by Lake Forest Park in King County. The cities of Mountlake Terrace and Bothell lie to the west and east, respectively. The unincorporated area to the north is connected by Brier Road, which continues towards Lynnwood.

According to the United States Census Bureau, the city has a total area of 2.13 square miles (5.52 km^{2}), all of it land. The city has large lot sizes for residential homes, at a minimum of 12,500 square feet (1,160 m^{2}) and is exclusively zoned for single-family homes.

== Economy ==
Brier is described as a "one-store and one-restaurant town", with few businesses on its lone commercial strip.

== Demographics ==
Historical population
Census	Pop.	Note	%±
1970	3,093		—
1980	2,915		−5.8%
1990	5,633		93.2%
2000	6,383		13.3%
2010	6,087		−4.6%
2020	6,560		7.8%
2022 (est.)	6,463		−1.5%
U.S. Decennial Census

Based on per capita income, one of the more reliable measures of affluence, Brier ranked 68th of 522 areas in the state of Washington in 2012.

=== 2020 census ===
As of the 2020 census, there were 6,560 people and 2,377 households living in Brier, which had a population density of 2,987.2 inhabitants per square mile (1,153.4/km^{2}). There were 2,413 total housing units, of which 98.5% were occupied and 1.5% were vacant or for occasional use. The racial makeup of the city was 75.5% White, 0.4% Native American and Alaskan Native, 1.4% Black or African American, 9.6% Asian, and 0.4% Native Hawaiian and Pacific Islander. Residents who listed another race were 1.9% of the population and those who identified as more than one race were 10.8% of the population. Hispanic or Latino residents of any race were 5.4% of the population.

Of the 2,377 households in Brier, 31.9% had children under the age of 18 living with them, 70.6% were married couples living together, and 5.8% were cohabitating but unmarried. Households with a male householder with no spouse or partner were 10.6% of the population, while households with a female householder with no spouse or partner were 13.0% of the population. Out of all households, 35.8% had residents who were 65 years of age or older. There were 2,377 occupied housing units in Brier, of which 90.9% were owner-occupied and 9.1% were occupied by renters.

The median age in the city was 46.0 years old for all sexes, 45.7 years old for males, and 46.5 years old for females. Of the total population, 21.2% of residents were under the age of 19; 21.4% were between the ages of 20 and 39; 38.1% were between the ages of 40 and 64; and 19.2% were 65 years of age or older. The gender makeup of the city was 50.2% male and 49.8% female.

=== 2010 census ===
As of the 2010 U.S. census, there were 6,087 people, 2,165 households, and 1,758 families living in the city. The population density was 2,857.7 inhabitants per square mile (1,103.4/km^{2}). There were 2,220 housing units at an average density of 1,042.3 per square mile (402.4/km^{2}). The racial makeup of the city was 84.9% White, 1.1% African American, 0.5% Native American, 7.6% Asian, 0.2% Pacific Islander, 1.4% from other races, and 4.3% from two or more races. Hispanic or Latino of any race were 4.0% of the population.

There were 2,165 households, of which 35.4% had children under the age of 18 living with them, 71.0% were married couples living together, 6.6% had a female householder with no husband present, 3.6% had a male householder with no wife present, and 18.8% were non-families. 12.7% of all households were made up of individuals, and 4% had someone living alone who was 65 years of age or older. The average household size was 2.81 and the average family size was 3.05.

The median age in the city was 44.4 years. 21.4% of residents were under the age of 18; 8.9% were between the ages of 18 and 24; 20.6% were from 25 to 44; 39.6% were from 45 to 64; and 9.6% were 65 years of age or older. The gender makeup of the city was 50.1% male and 49.9% female.

== Government ==
The Brier city government has 19 total employees and budgeted general fund expenditures of over $4 million for 2023. It derives most of its revenue from property taxes. The city government has fewer staff members relative to its population than other rural cities in the Puget Sound region. Former city councilmember Dale Kaemingk was appointed as mayor in July 2020 and was elected to a full four-year term in 2021.

At the federal level, Brier is part of the 1st congressional district, represented by Democrat Suzan DelBene since 2012. The district encompasses parts of Snohomish and King counties between Arlington and Bellevue that generally lie east of Interstate 5. At the state level, the city is part of the 32nd legislative district, which also includes Lynnwood, Mountlake Terrace, Shoreline, and portions of Edmonds and Seattle. Brier is also part of the Snohomish County Council's 4th district, which includes Mill Creek, Mountlake Terrace, and northern Bothell.

== Culture ==
The community holds an annual one-day event in August called SeaScare, a play on the name of Seattle's Seafair. The event includes a Porch Light Parade, contests, music and a screening of a classic movie, among other activities. It involves nautical themes, in keeping with its Seafair ties, and is supported by the small number of Brier businesses.

=== Library ===
Brier is part of the Sno-Isle Libraries system, which operates public libraries in Island and Snohomish counties. A permanent city library opened in November 1974 at the former city hall and replaced a bookmobile service. Brier residents approved a 20-year bond issue in 1995 to finance construction of a new library with twice as many books and more computers. The new library building opened on May 3, 1996, and has 2,980 square feet (277 m^{2}) of space.

== Education ==
Most of Brier lies within the boundaries of the Edmonds School District, which operates public schools for most of South Snohomish County, including the cities of Edmonds, Lynnwood, Mountlake Terrace, and Woodway. The district has 41 total schools and an enrollment of over 20,400 students as of the 2022–23 school year. The Edmonds School District has one elementary school and one middle school within Brier; high school students are within the zone for Mountlake Terrace High School. The southeastern corner of the city lies within the Northshore School District, which also serves Bothell and Kenmore.

== Infrastructure ==
=== Transportation ===
The city lies between Interstate 5 to the west and Interstate 405 to the east, which are accessed through Mountlake Terrace and Bothell, respectively. Brier has several local roads that connect with regional highways and a total of 28.5 miles (45.9 km) of roads, predominately residential and low-volume streets, within the city limits. The city has no state routes or railroads. Community Transit operates one bus route through Brier that connects to Mountlake Terrace station, a Link light rail station and bus hub, during peak hours. The agency has one park-and-ride lot along the bus route. An on-demand microtransit service, Metro Flex, was launched in Brier and neighboring communities by King County Metro in September 2024 and withdrawn in April 2026.

=== Utilities ===
Brier is served by the Alderwood Water and Wastewater District, which purchases its tap water from the City of Everett's system that is sourced from Spada Lake.

== Notable people ==
- Jacqueline Cako, tennis player
