= Edmount Island =

Island in Lake Ballinger, Washington, United States

Coordinates: 47.7827°N 122.3303°W

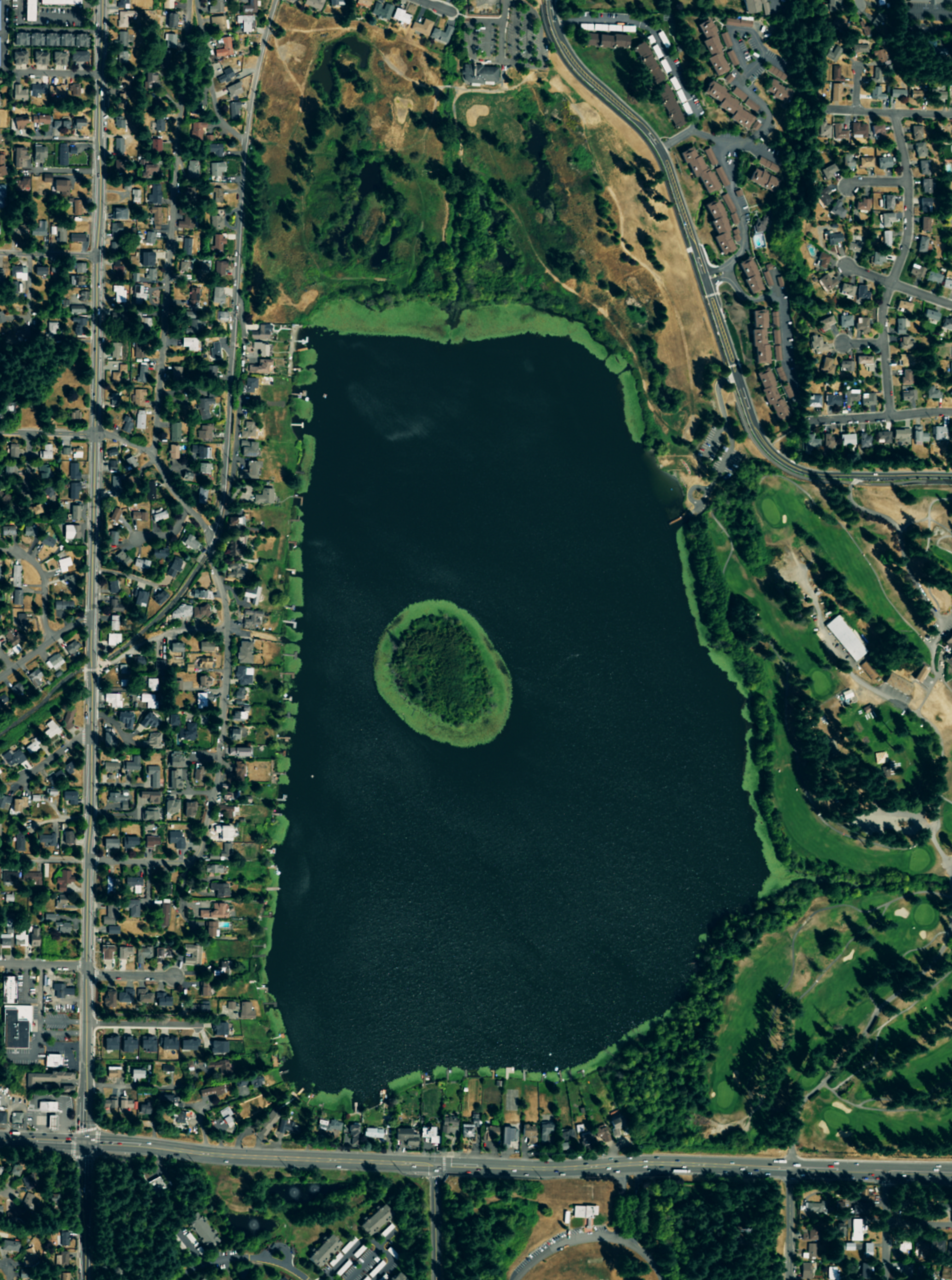
Edmount Island pictured in the center of Lake Ballinger

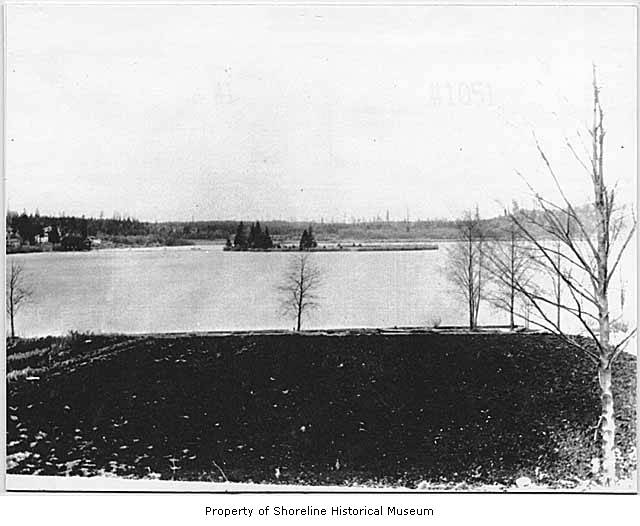
Edmount Island and bridge in 1925

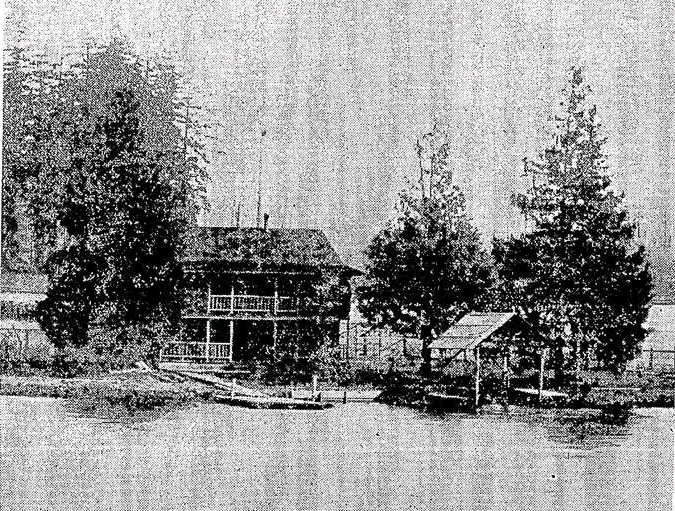
Ballinger lodge on Edmount Island, 1915

Edmount Island, also called Ballinger Island, (Note: listed as Ballinger Island on Bing Maps; listed as Edmount Island on Google Maps; no label on 2017 United States Geological Survey 1:24,000 topographic quad "Edmonds East") is a 3-acre (1.2 ha) island in Lake Ballinger, in the Seattle suburbs of south Snohomish County, in the U.S. state of Washington.

A home was constructed on the island c. the early 1900s, in which lived settlers Ira Bartholemew and Julia Bartholomew, who may have built it as a hunting lodge, then Seattle mayor Richard A. Ballinger and Julia Ballinger during the summers, and Richard Achilles' father Col. Richard Henry Ballinger (from whom the lake the island is situated in is named for), a U.S. Civil War veteran. The Bartholomews were from Pennsylvania and homesteaded the lake island in 1862 – "perhaps, the only homestead of its kind in the entire country" – requiring the United States government to re-survey the land which did not exist in official records. A land patent was issued in 1902. At one time, a wooden bridge linked the west shore to the island.

As of the 2010s, the island is part of Mountlake Terrace's Ballinger Park. The home and lodge are no longer standing. The island is made of peat, which was completely engulfed in a runaway barbecue fire during a summer heat wave in 2009. Since the fire, the island has been closed to public access, with emergency access provided by the local fire department's rigid inflatable boat.
