= Sno-Isle Libraries =

Public library system in Washington state

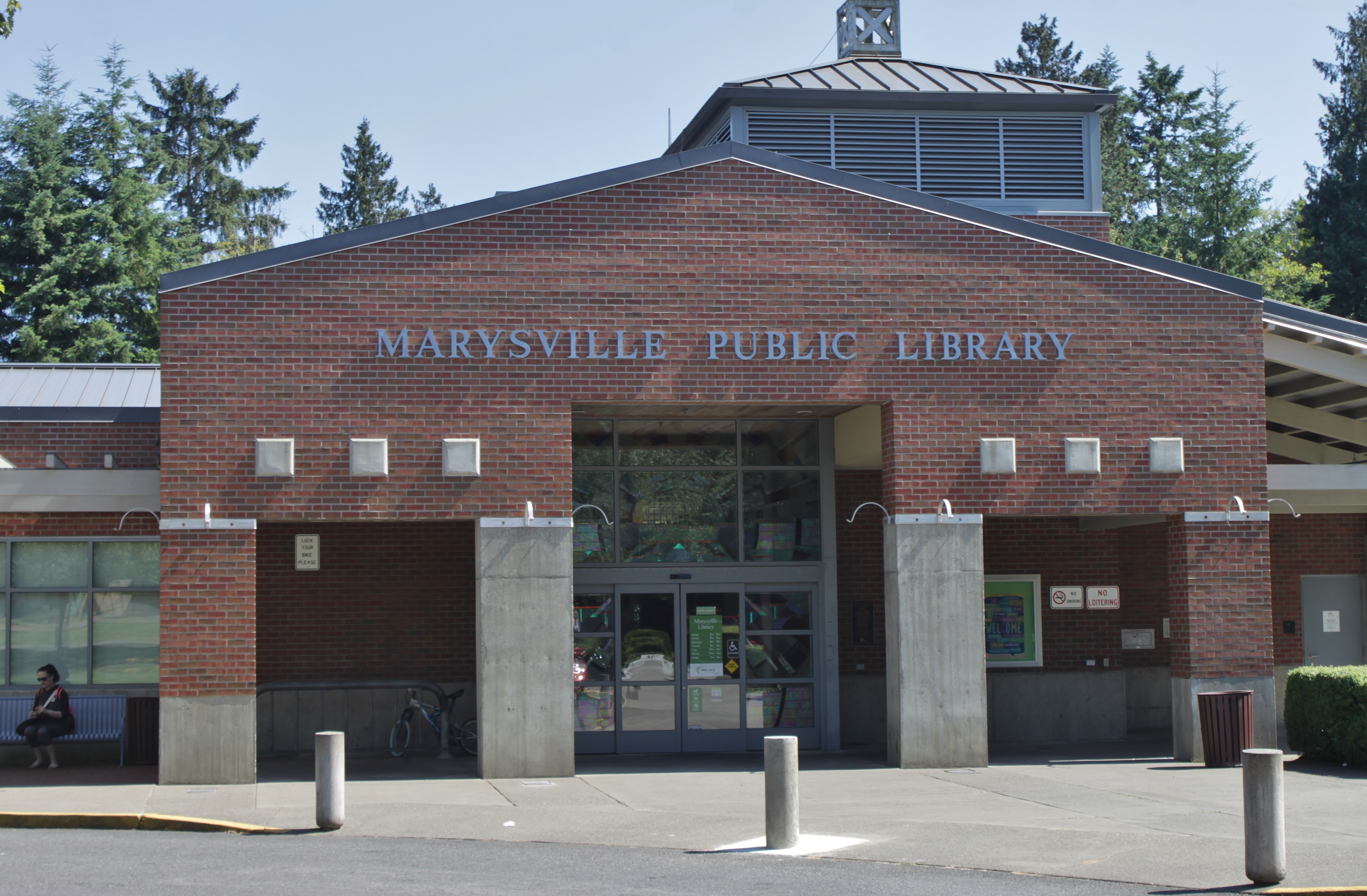
- The Marysville branch of Sno-Isle Libraries, opened in 1995
- 48°03′46″N 122°11′09″W
- Type: Public library
- Established: December 17, 1962
- Service area: Island and Snohomish counties, Washington
- Branches: 23

Collection
- Size: 906,489 items

Access and use
- Circulation: 10.9 million
- Population served: 819,554
- Members: 516,489

Other information
- Budget: $80.9 million (2026)
- Director: Eric Howard
- Employees: 394 (2026)
- Website: sno-isle.org
- References: Washington Public Library Statistical Report, 2024

The Sno-Isle Regional Library, doing business as Sno-Isle Libraries (Note: The library system is referred to as the Sno-Isle Intercounty Rural Library District in legal contracts and referendums.), is a public library system serving Island and Snohomish counties in the U.S. state of Washington. The system is among the largest in Washington state and has an annual circulation of 11 million materials. The library's 23 branches and bookmobile services reach every incorporated city in the two counties, with the exception of Everett (which retains its own municipal system) and Woodway. Sno-Isle was formed in 1962, from the merger of two systems serving each county that were established in 1944 and 1962.

== History ==
While cities in Island and Snohomish counties established their own libraries in the early 20th century, the first inter-city system was created by voters in unincorporated Snohomish County in 1944. The system's creation was spurred by the state legislature's approval of rural library districts in 1941. The new Snohomish County Library was temporarily headquartered in the basement of the separate Everett Public Library before moving to another building in Everett. The system's first library was in Alderwood Manor; the first bookmobile was purchased in 1947.

The state government sponsored demonstration library and bookmobile projects on Camano and Whidbey islands in 1961, which created interest in establishing an Island County system. The Island County Rural Library District was established by voters in November 1962 and merged with the Snohomish County system on December 17, forming the Snohomish-Island Inter-County Rural Library District.

The board of trustees for the new library system was formed during a meeting on January 11, 1963; after the board members were appointed, they decided to name the system the Sno-Isle Regional Library. A new headquarters building near Marysville was constructed in 1965. Initially, the Sno-Isle Regional Library signed contracts with incorporated cities to operate their libraries and join the system for a fixed amount. Rural branches would rely on property taxes generated within the district, as well as donations from organizations and members of the community. The library system purchased and installed its first computerized catalog system in 1983. Incorporated cities began voting to annex themselves into the Sno-Isle district in the late 1980s, with promises of new libraries and potential cost savings over the contracted service.

Former logo of Sno-Isle Libraries

A major levy lift of 9 cents per $1,000 in assessed property value was approved by voters in May 2018 by a margin of less than 0.5 percent. All Sno-Isle branches were closed in March 2020 due to the COVID-19 pandemic, but reopened with curbside pick-up service three months later. In-person services resumed at some branches in early 2021.

In 2024, the city government of Everett proposed a consolidation of their city libraries with Sno-Isle to address a budget deficit. The Everett Public Library's board of trustees opposed the proposal, which would require voter approval.

== Branches ==
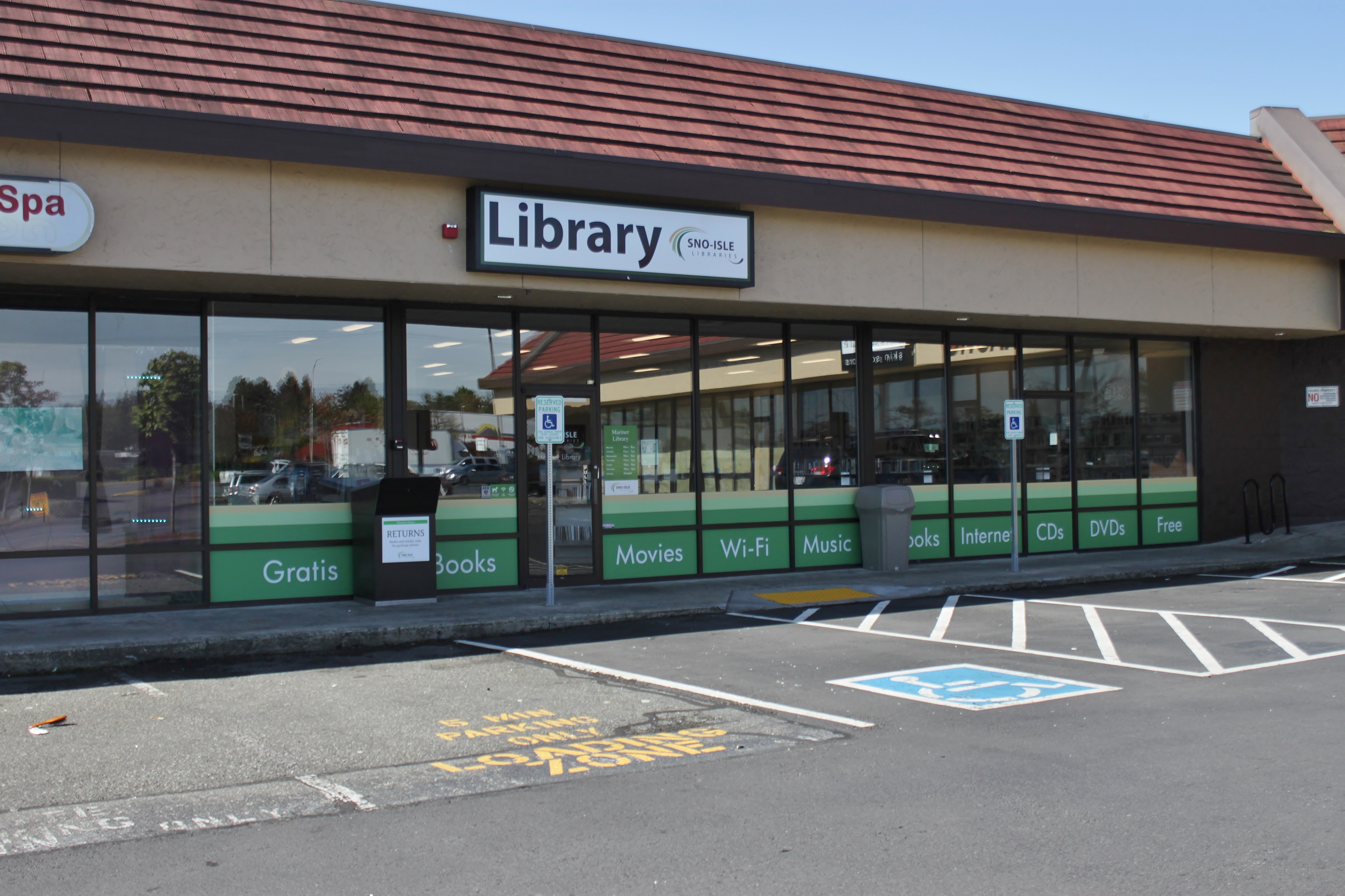
The Mariner demonstration library, which opened in 2016

The Sno-Isle Libraries system has 23 branches. They serve every city in Island and Snohomish counties, with the exception of two cities: Everett, which has its own system, and Woodway, which had contracted service until 1978. The system covers an area of 2,260 square miles (5,900 km^{2}) and a population of over 800,000 residents. The largest library is the Lynnwood branch, which covers 26,000 square feet (2,400 m^{2}) and has over 111,000 physical items in its collection.

Two locations, in the Mariner area of Everett and Smokey Point area of Arlington, are "demonstration" libraries that are in leased retail spaces that precede a permanent branch. The Camano Island location was formerly a demonstration library that was replaced by a permanent branch in 2015. A permanent library for the Mariner neighborhood is planned to begin construction in 2026 as part of a mixed-use development.

Sno-Isle Libraries branches
Name	Annexed	Opened	Floor space		Items (2024)	Circulation (2024)
Name	Annexed	Opened	sq ft	sq m	Items (2024)	Circulation (2024)
Arlington		1981	5,055	470	25,259	194,389
Brier		1996	2,840	264	15,241	88,965
Camano Island		2015	5,429	504	14,197	152,311
Clinton		2000	1,296	120	4,806	49,974
Coupeville		2010	6,000	557	15,727	117,497
Darrington	2008	2009	3,372	313	7,943	46,969
Edmonds	2001	1982	16,726	1,554	44,656	394,637
Freeland		2006	4,854	451	21,205	171,950
Granite Falls		2001	6,534	607	25,137	104,749
Lake Stevens	2008	1985	5,000	465	14,360	188,410
Lakewood/Smokey Point		2018	4,163	387	13,077	79,307
Langley	2012	1923	4,985	463	10,408	66,981
Lynnwood		1999	25,920	2,408	111,420	734,293
Mariner (Everett)		2017	3,850	358	16,488	119,461
Marysville	1968	1995	23,000	2,137	94,936	530,168
Mill Creek		1992	7,400	687	43,095	484,195
Monroe	1966	2002	20,000	1,858	52,929	293,515
Mountlake Terrace	1985	1988	12,842	1,193	42,388	238,761
Mukilteo	1996	1998	15,268	1,418	52,548	398,999
Oak Harbor		1993	11,200	1,041	52,753	282,998
Snohomish		2003	23,500	2,183	95,059	607,445
Stanwood		1986	5,400	502	26,638	177,827
Sultan	2008	1999	4,400	409	22,577	79,139

== Operations ==
The Sno-Isle Libraries system is headquartered at an administration and processing center on the Tulalip Indian Reservation, west of Marysville, that opened in 1966. The library system is governed by a seven-member board of trustees, of whom two are appointed by Island County and five by Snohomish County. It is overseen by an executive director that is appointed by the board of trustees. Eric Howard has been the executive director since 2024. Sno-Isle had 394 full-time equivalent employees in 2026.

As of 2026, the library system has annual expenditures of $80.9 million and revenues of $75.5 million. A property tax levied on all properties within the district generates 91 percent of its revenue. In 2024, the assessed value of all properties in the district was $202.1 billion. The remaining two percent of revenue was sourced from a timber excise tax, a leasehold excise tax, contract fees from municipal governments, and donations.

In 2024, Sno-Isle had a total circulation of 10.9 million items, placing it third in Washington behind the King County Library System and Seattle Public Library. The system also ranked third in the size of its physical collection, at over 906,000 items, and second in the turnover rate at 6.27 checkouts per item. Sno-Isle had 516,489 registered members in 2024 and nearly 2.45 million visits at its 23 branches. The system had 725 public computers that were used 313,483 total times in 2024.
