= Hall's Lake =

Lake in Lynnwood, Washington

- Interactive map of Hall's Lake
- Location: Lynnwood, Washington
- Coordinates: 47°48′28″N 122°18′33″W
- Type: Kettle
- Basin countries: United States

Hall's Lake (officially named Hall Lake) is a private freshwater kettle lake located in Lynnwood, Washington. It is very small and is about 70–80 feet deep.

The lake was named after American war veteran and homesteader Riley Hall.

== History ==
In 1885, the eastern side of the lake was homesteaded by Riley Hall.

Five years after, Hall was issued a land patent, and on this map, his homestead was labeled as the Hall Lake Tracts, thus giving the lake its name. Eventually, Hall became disabled and couldn't work to develop his property. Around 1904, he became a resident at the Washington Soldiers Home and Colony in Orting, Washington, where he eventually died and was buried in the cemetery at the soldier’s home.

In 1913, the eastern side of Hall's Lake became open to the public (with the homestead already cleared from the area) for people to picnic and swim at. A resort was opened at the area named Eisen's Resort. The color of the water was a yellow-brown color due to the former lumber mills and cedar logs that were dumped into the lake. However, the resort was sold in 1945 and became unavailable to the public.

== Habitat ==
Hall's Lake is known to have emergent wetlands. The lake mainly hosts rainbow trout that are annually planted by the local homeowners association. There are also currently coho salmon being released into the lake.

The lake outflows into Hall Creek, which flows southwest and then leads into Lake Ballinger, which roughly provides 65 percent of Lake Ballinger's total inflow.

== Salmon hatchery ==
In 2015, a small piece of land by the lake was bought by the City of Lynnwood for easy access to the lake for the purposes of monitoring water quality.

Bruce Lawson, a private resident of the lake, heard this and told the city of an opportunity. As Lawson explained, he and his friends had been releasing salmon into the lake for nearly three decades, and when he heard about the land purchase, he saw it as an opportunity for the city to be involved, thus leading to the City of Lynnwood staff to build a hatchery, releasing 30,000 coho salmon into the lake every year.
