= Mountlake Terrace, Washington =

City in Washington, United States

Mountlake Terrace
- City
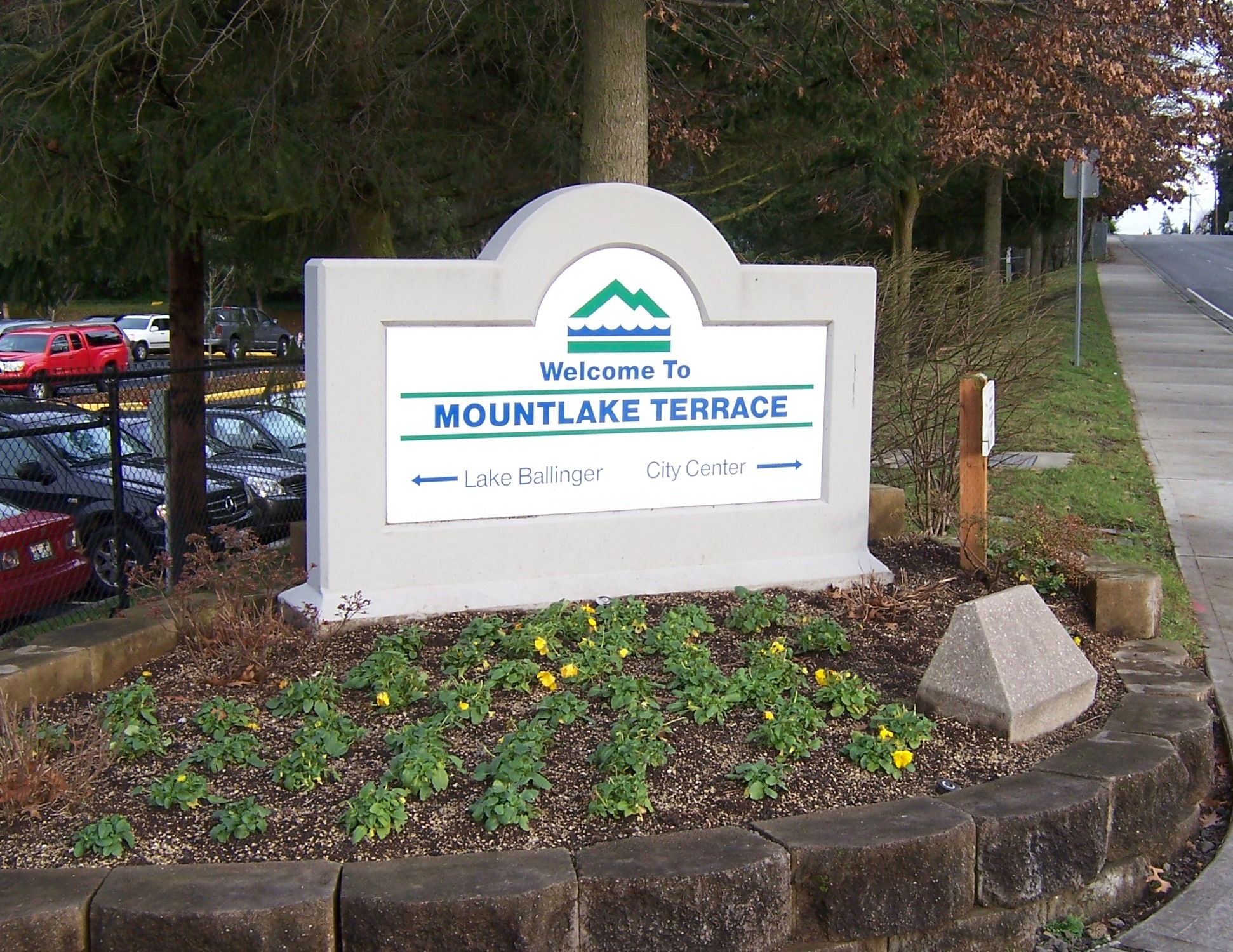
- Welcome sign at Interstate 5 and 236th Street Southwest
- Interactive map of Mountlake Terrace
- Coordinates: 47°47′27″N 122°18′24″W
- Country: United States
- State: Washington
- County: Snohomish
- Incorporated: November 29, 1954

Government
  - Type: Council–manager
  - Mayor: Steve Woodard
  - Manager: Jeff Niten

Area
  - Total: 4.16 sq mi (10.78 km^{2})
  - Land: 4.05 sq mi (10.50 km^{2})
  - Water: 0.10 sq mi (0.27 km^{2})
- Elevation: 456 ft (139 m)

Population (2020)
  - Total: 21,286
  - Estimate (2024): 25,198
  - Density: 5,114.1/sq mi (1,974.58/km^{2})
- Time zone: UTC-8 (Pacific Time Zone)
  - Summer (DST): UTC-7 (PDT)
- ZIP code: 98043
- Area code: 425
- FIPS code: 53-47490
- GNIS feature ID: 1512488
- Website: cityofmlt.com

Mountlake Terrace is a suburban city in Snohomish County, Washington, United States. It lies on the southern border of the county, adjacent to Shoreline and Lynnwood, and is 13 miles (21 km) north of Seattle. The city had a population of 21,286 as of the 2020 census.

Mountlake Terrace was founded in 1949 by real estate developers on the site of a disused airfield, intending to provide low-cost housing for veterans. Within five years, the community had grown to over 5,000 people and was incorporated as a city in 1954 to provide municipal services. An industrial park was developed at the northwest corner of the city, which was connected by Interstate 5 after it opened in 1965. Mountlake Terrace originally had several small shopping centers that declined due to the local economy and a pair of arsons in 1990.

The city government began developing a downtown revitalization plan with mixed-use buildings in the 2000s, with hopes of growing beyond a bedroom community for Seattle commuters. Mountlake Terrace station, a major bus hub, opened in 2009 and is also served by Link light rail service, which began in 2024. The city has several parks, including access to Lake Ballinger, and hosts an annual summer festival that is part of Seafair.

== History ==
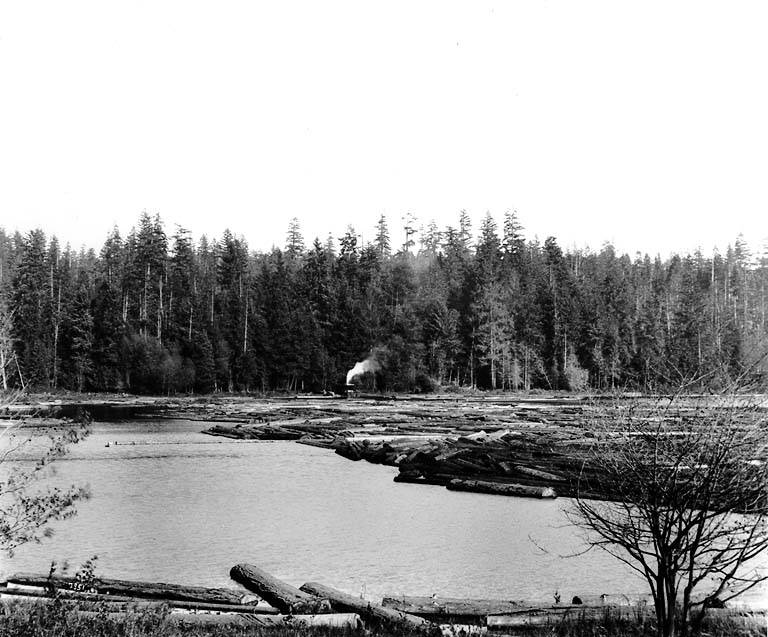
Logging on Lake Ballinger, photographed by Asahel Curtis in 1907

The southwestern region of Snohomish County was originally inhabited by the Snohomish people, who primarily settled along the Puget Sound and used inland areas for seasonal hunting and foraging. In 1862, Puget Mill Company acquired 17,000 acres (6,900 ha) in the newly-formed county, including the thickly-forested plateau where modern-day Mountlake Terrace sits and the adjacent Lake McAleer. The land was logged by 1900 and was later subdivided into 10-acre (4.0 ha) chicken ranches, which were sold to farmers. Judge Richard A. Ballinger purchased Lake McAleer in 1901 and renamed it to Lake Ballinger for his father, later leaving the area to become Seattle mayor. The Nile Shrine of Seattle purchased 135 acres (55 ha) on the east side of the lake in 1927, building a clubhouse and later a private golf course.

An interurban railway between Everett and Seattle opened in 1910, improving access from the farms to various markets. Many of these small farms failed during the Great Depression and were affected by the closure of the interurban in 1939, following the completion of Highway 99. The area remained home to chicken and mink farms well into the 1950s, while areas to the south underwent suburban development.

=== Development and incorporation ===
A landing field was built on the north side of the King–Snohomish county line by the federal government for use during World War II. It was abandoned after the war, despite plans to expand it for civilian aviation, and acquired by real estate developers Albert LaPierre and Jack Peterson in 1949. LaPierre and Peterson named the property "Mountlake Terrace" for its plateau-like setting with views of Lake Washington and Mount Rainier, and sought to develop a low-income bedroom community for returning veterans. Construction on the first 250 homes began in June 1949, using a simple 20-by-30-foot (6.1 by 9.1 m) floorplan with two bedrooms and basic amenities. The cinderblock homes were built in an assembly line, taking several weeks to complete and leaving landscaping and interior painting to the owners. The homes were initially priced at a minimum of $4,999 (equivalent to $52,000 in 2024 dollars) and sold quickly, requiring expansion beyond the initial subdivision.

Mountlake Terrace was one of the first large-scale suburban developments in the Pacific Northwest, becoming the second-largest residential area in Snohomish County with 5,000 people by 1954. LaPierre and Peterson developed additional areas to the north and east of their initial subdivision, later adding larger homes that remained in an affordable price range for young families. A small shopping center opened on the south side of the county line, followed by a second in the modern-day Town Center in June 1954 with the area's first supermarket. Mountlake Terrace remained an unincorporated area that was reliant on the county government for services, which were unable to cope with the rising population of the area. The telephone system used a party line shared between 10 homes, the water mains and septic tanks were prone to failure, and the community lacked protection due to their distance from the nearest sheriff's precinct.

LaPierre and Peterson funded construction of a local fire station and provided a police radio to link community volunteers with the county sheriff in Everett, but response times for emergencies remained long. Patrick McMahan, a local firefighter, began organizing an incorporation campaign in 1953 after waiting a day for the sheriff to respond to an attempted burglary at his home. He first proposed an annexation into Edmonds at a city council meeting in June 1953, where he was rejected by the mayor but approached by a city councilmember who suggested incorporating as a separate city. An incorporation committee was formed by McMahan and other residents, including two attorneys, and collected 650 signatures for their petition to the county government.

The county commissioners scheduled an incorporation ballot measure and a concurrent city council election for November 23, 1954. An anti-incorporation bloc was formed by Mountlake Terrace residents who were opposed to increased taxes and potential costs that were previously covered by the county government. The vote ended 517–483 in favor of incorporating as a third-class city with a council–manager government and elected five councilmembers, including the wife of an anti-incorporation leader. The new city council convened the following day and appointed hardware store owner Gilbert "Gil" Geiser as the first mayor of Mountlake Terrace. Geiser loaned $5 (equivalent to $46 in 2024 dollars) to the city government to file an incorporation charter with the state government, which was issued on November 29 and delivered the following day. City manager Evan Peterson was hired from Bellevue and initially conducted city business from his car before renting an empty two-bedroom house to act as an interim city hall.

=== Early growth ===
Within a few years of incorporating, the city government had rebuilt most of Mountlake Terrace's original roads, added 14 miles (23 km) of sidewalks, and begun work on a permanent water and sewer system. The early homes in the neighborhood were renovated and expanded with financial assistance from the Federal Housing Administration, which also encouraged neighborhood improvements. In 1955, the city annexed 150 acres (61 ha), bringing its population to over 5,400, opened its own post office, and established a police department with five full-time personnel. The Edmonds School District built several schools for the growing city, including Mountlake Terrace High School, which opened in September 1960.

Mountlake Terrace's population increased by 50 percent within its first five years of incorporating and doubled between 1950 and 1960. LaPierre and Peterson donated land for the construction of several churches, including the St. Pius X Catholic Church, which held its first mass on June 22, 1955. In 1958, the city government signed agreements with the sewer districts of Edmonds and Ronald (now part of Shoreline) to form a "Little Metro" and share treatment facilities. The city also placed restrictions on relocated homes from Seattle later that year, following a surge of those displaced from the construction of Interstate 5, a major regional freeway that would later reach Mountlake Terrace.

In the early 1960s, a new industrial park was developed in Mountlake Terrace that attracted several companies, including electronics firm John Fluke Corporation, who moved 325 employees from Seattle in 1960. Several retailers and other small businesses opened at Mountlake Terrace's shopping centers, including a pair facing each other at the intersection of 232nd Street Southwest and 56th Avenue West. The city passed a bond issue in 1961 to fund construction of a permanent city hall, which opened in October 1962 with 17,800 square feet (1,650 m^{2}) of space for the city government, police department, and fire department. In 1964, Mountlake Terrace approved a bond issue solely for parks, which was later used to construct the Recreation Pavilion in 1968.

Interstate 5 opened on February 3, 1965, providing faster access from bedroom communities in Snohomish County to Seattle. On the same day, the adjacent area of Brier voted to be incorporated as a city, in part to prevent an annexation by Mountlake Terrace. The two cities later settled a dispute over sewer services that would allow Brier to use Mountlake Terrace's system.

=== Late 20th century ===
The completion of the Boeing Everett Factory spurred continued population growth in the region, with Mountlake Terrace nearly doubling to over 16,000 residents by 1970. The prosperity was short-lived, however, as Boeing announced major layoffs after the collapse of the supersonic transport program, which caused a local recession. The city government had hoped to develop a standalone town center, but local businesses were unable to compete with the Alderwood Mall in Lynnwood, which opened in 1979 and drew away shoppers. Mountlake Terrace's population declined slightly in the 1970s, resulting in the closure of some local schools and the post office. The number of housing units increased significantly through the construction of apartments and condominiums, but the average occupancy per household decreased. The city government had a budget deficit of $420,000 in 1979 (equivalent to $1.46 million in 2024 dollars) due to declines in revenue and its small sales tax base.

Fluke moved its headquarters in Everett in 1981 and was later replaced by Blue Cross, which moved from Seattle and became the largest employer in the city. The city government continued to encourage development of its industrial center on the northwest side of Interstate 5, including improvements to a freeway interchange and special zoning initiatives. The freeway project also included funding from the state government to improve city parks and sports fields as compensation for lost land at an elementary school in Melody Hill. A 18-acre (7.3 ha) site at the southwest corner of the original subdivision with 14 homes and several small business was proposed for a hotel and commercial development that was later put on hold because of planning complications. The site was later revived in the late 1980s as Gateway Place, an office and retail complex that began construction in 1989.

Despite repeated decreases in spending, the city's budget had a $1.3 million deficit (equivalent to $2.85 million in 2024 dollars) in 1989 due to increased administrative costs. A pair of arson fires in downtown Mountlake Terrace destroyed two shopping centers and caused $3 million in damage (equivalent to $6.35 million in 2024 dollars). As a result, one shopping center took 20 months to reopen and the other was closed permanently. The city government opposed the construction of a strip club in the 1990s and debated a comprehensive rezoning of the town center to support traditional retail and commercial uses. Mountlake Terrace rebuilt its high school in 1991 and opened a variety of recreational facilities by the end of the decade, including an indoor ice-skating rink and a section of the multi-use Interurban Trail, alongside plans for two casinos.

=== 21st century redevelopment ===
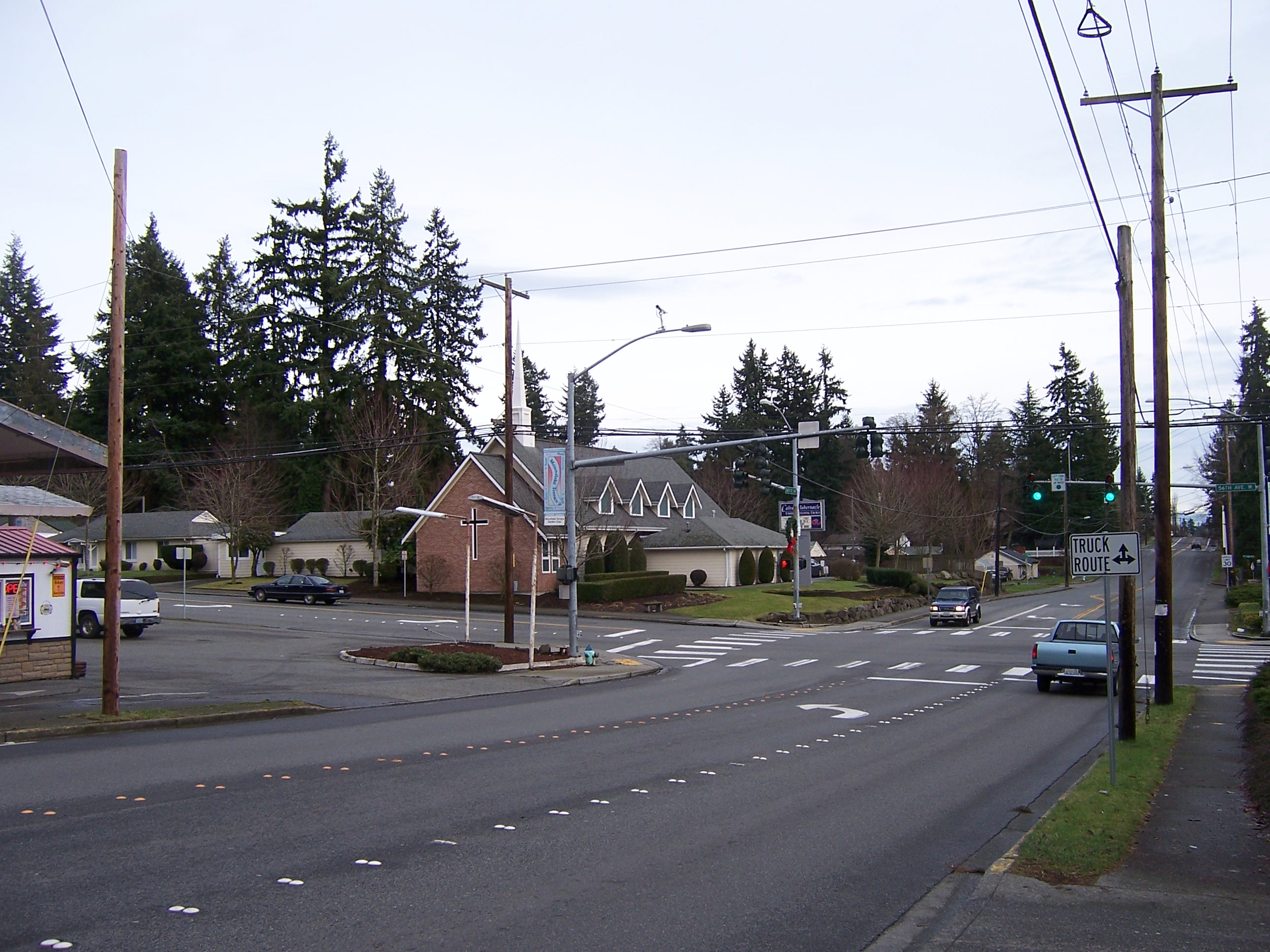
An intersection in the Mountlake Terrace town center in 2010, before major development began

The city government began planning for a redeveloped town center in the early 2000s, passing zoning regulations to spur the construction of mixed-use residential and commercial. The town center plan, which was adopted in 2007, allowed for building heights of up to seven stories, encouraged architectural variety, and required smaller setbacks from sidewalks. The changes were dependent on the construction of the Mountlake Terrace Transit Center, a major bus hub that opened in 2007 with a parking garage.

The first major project to use the new town center plan, a five-story apartment building with shops, was approved in 2010 and opened in 2013 as Arbor Village. Two more buildings were completed later in the decade, along with reconstruction of the city's main street (56th Avenue West). An extension of Link light rail along Interstate 5, including a station at Mountlake Terrace Transit Center, was approved by voters in 2008 and opened in 2024. The light rail extension triggered an update to the town center in 2019 that would allow for building heights of 12 stories and encouraging walkable development with smaller blocks. A strip of land along Interstate 5 near the transit center, including the former Evergreen Elementary School, is being redeveloped into a three-building housing complex with 600 apartments and retail space that will open in stages from 2020 to 2026.

The city hall building was permanently closed on July 18, 2009, a year after a ceiling collapse in the city council chambers revealed structural issues and hidden asbestos. The city government temporarily relocated to various office spaces in the city before moving into an interim city hall at an office park. The building was demolished in 2010 and funding for a new city hall at the site was approved by voters in 2017 as the centerpiece of a civic campus adjacent to Veterans Memorial Park. The new city hall opened in September 2021 and cost $12.5 million to construct.

== Geography ==
Mountlake Terrace is in southwestern Snohomish County, approximately 14 miles (23 km) north of Downtown Seattle on Interstate 5. It is on the southern border of the county, beyond which lies the cities of Shoreline and Lake Forest Park in King County. The city limits are generally defined to the west by Hall Creek and the Interurban Trail, separating it from Edmonds; to the north by 212th Street Southwest and Lynnwood; and to the east by 39th Avenue West and Brier. According to the United States Census Bureau, the city has a total area of 4.16 square miles (10.77 km^{2}), of which 4.06 sq mi (10.52 km^{2}) is land and 0.10 sq mi (0.26 km^{2}) is water.

The city sits on a plateau that is elevated from the surrounding landscape, with views of the Olympic and Cascade mountains. The Mountlake Terrace's elevation ranges from 263 to 528 feet (80 to 161 m) above sea level, with an average altitude of 440 feet (130 m). The southwestern portion of the city includes the 100-acre (40 ha) Lake Ballinger, which is fed by Hall Creek from Lynnwood and discharges into McAleer Creek towards Lake Washington. Other portions of Mountlake Terrace lie in the watersheds of Lyon Creek and Swamp Creek, which both drain into Lake Washington.

=== Neighborhoods ===
Mountlake Terrace is divided into six designated neighborhoods for use in city planning: the Town Center, Cascade View (formerly North Terrace), Cedar Terrace (formerly East Terrace), Gateway, Lake Ballinger, and Melody Hill.

- The Town Center between 220th and 236th streets is home to several retailers, restaurants, and civic buildings near Veterans Memorial Park. It is planned to be developed into a mixed-use community with commercial and office space alongside denser housing.
- Cedar Terrace is located east of the Town Center and Terrace Creek Park, which is along a section of Lyon Creek. The neighborhood is predominantly residential, with a shopping center and several apartment complexes along Cedar Way.
- Cascade View encompasses the north side of the city, stretching from Interstate 5 in the west to the border with Brier in the east. It is predominantly residential and also includes the high school campus and a shopping center.
- The Gateway neighborhood is a mostly residential neighborhood to the south of the Town Center with a commercial center near Interstate 5 and its interchange with State Route 104. A parcel at the western edge of the neighborhood is being developed into a three-building complex with 600 apartments and retail.
- The predominantly residential Lake Ballinger neighborhood is located at the southwest corner of Mountlake Terrace, between the Interurban Trail and Interstate 5, and includes the eponymous lake.
- Melody Hill has a mix of office parks, industrial businesses, and apartment buildings located in the northwest corner of the city. The neighborhood is located atop a hill west of Interstate 5 and north of Lake Ballinger.

== Economy ==
Largest employers (2022)
Employer	Employees
1. Premera Blue Cross	2,446
2. City of Mountlake Terrace	192
3. 1st Security Bank	175
4. Umpqua Bank	124
5. Safeway	110

As of 2018, Mountlake Terrace has an estimated workforce population of 12,251 people, of which 11,753 are employed. The largest sectors of employment are educational and health services, at 26 percent, followed by professional services (12.9%) and retail (12.3%). The majority of workers in the city commute to other areas for employment, including 37.0 percent to Seattle, 6.9 percent to Lynnwood, 6.0 percent to Everett, and 5.8 percent to Bellevue. Only 3.2 percent of Mountlake Terrace residents work within the city limits. Over 67 percent of workers commute in single-occupant vehicles, while 13 percent take public transportation and 12 percent use carpools.

The city had 1,404 registered businesses with 6,993 total jobs, according to 2012 estimates by the U.S. Census and Puget Sound Regional Council, with most belonging to the professional services sector. Mountlake Terrace's employers attract commuters from around the region, with about 11 percent of workers living in Seattle and 7 percent from Everett. The largest employer in the city Terrace is health insurance firm Premera Blue Cross, which has over 2,400 employees at its Mountlake Terrace headquarters. Another major employer is Umpqua Bank, which absorbed Sterling Bank and its Mountlake Terrace-based subsidiary Golf Savings Bank.

Mountlake Terrace's businesses had $223 million in total taxable retail sales in 2016, growing by 46 percent over a five-year period. The city has several shopping centers that are concentrated in neighborhood centers and the Town Center area, which is proposed to become a mixed-use district. The Town Center is home to several major retailers and restaurants, including the Diamond Knot Brewpub and Double DD Meats, among the oldest surviving businesses in the city. Several office parks and industrial buildings are located on the 220th Street Southwest corridor northwest of the Town Center, including the Premera headquarters and other healthcare employers.

== Demographics ==
Historical population
Census	Pop.	Note	%±
1960	9,122		—
1970	16,600		82.0%
1980	16,534		−0.4%
1990	19,320		16.9%
2000	20,362		5.4%
2010	19,909		−2.2%
2020	21,286		6.9%
2024 (est.)	25,198		18.4%
U.S. Decennial Census

Mountlake Terrace is the seventh largest city in Snohomish County by population, with 21,286 residents as of the 2020 U.S. census. The city grew to a population of over 16,000 within 15 years of incorporating, but has remained mostly stable since then, with a jump in the 1980s and a small decline in the 2000s that resulted in school closures. The area was originally developed with single-family homes, but newer buildings include multi-family housing and denser residential development. Mountlake Terrace is a major bedroom community with 96.8 percent of residents in the workforce employed at workplaces outside of the city limits.

=== 2020 census ===
As of the 2020 census, there were 21,286 people and 8,764 households living in Mountlake Terrace, which had a population density of 5,248.0 inhabitants per square mile (2,026.3/km^{2}). There were 9,202 total housing units, of which 95.2% were occupied and 4.8% were vacant or for occasional use. The racial makeup of the city was 61.9% White, 1.1% Native American and Alaskan Native, 5.3% Black or African American, 12.5% Asian, and 1.0% Native Hawaiian and Pacific Islander. Residents who listed another race were 5.5% of the population and those who identified as more than one race were 12.7% of the population. Hispanic or Latino residents of any race were 12.6% of the population.

Of the 8,764 households in Mountlake Terrace, 41.7% were married couples living together and 9.7% were cohabitating but unmarried. Households with a male householder with no spouse or partner were 20.5% of the population, while households with a female householder with no spouse or partner were 28.1% of the population. Out of all households, 27.1% had children under the age of 18 living with them and 27.5% had residents who were 65 years of age or older. There were 8,764 occupied housing units in Mountlake Terrace, of which 59.0% were owner-occupied and 41.0% were occupied by renters.

The median age in the city was 38.7 years old for all sexes, 37.2 years old for males, and 40.1 years old for females. Of the total population, 20.2% of residents were under the age of 19; 31.8% were between the ages of 20 and 39; 32.8% were between the ages of 40 and 64; and 15.0% were 65 years of age or older. The gender makeup of the city was 49.9% male and 50.1% female.

=== 2010 census ===
As of the 2010 U.S. census, there were 19,909 people, 8,192 households, and 4,891 families living in the city. The population density was 4,903.7 inhabitants per square mile (1,893.3/km^{2}). There were 8,602 housing units at an average density of 2,118.7 per square mile (818.0/km^{2}). The racial makeup of the city was 71.7% White, 4.3% African American, 1.1% Native American, 11.2% Asian, 0.8% Pacific Islander, 4.9% from other races, and 6.1% from two or more races. Hispanic or Latino of any race were 10.5% of the population.

There were 8,192 households, of which 30.8% had children under the age of 18 living with them, 41.2% were married couples living together, 12.8% had a female householder with no husband present, 5.7% had a male householder with no wife present, and 40.3% were non-families. 30.3% of all households were made up of individuals, and 7.7% had someone living alone who was 65 years of age or older. The average household size was 2.42 and the average family size was 3.04.

The median age in the city was 36.6 years. 21.6% of residents were under the age of 18; 9.4% were between the ages of 18 and 24; 31.4% were from 25 to 44; 27.4% were from 45 to 64; and 10.3% were 65 years of age or older. The gender makeup of the city was 48.9% male and 51.1% female.

== Government and politics ==
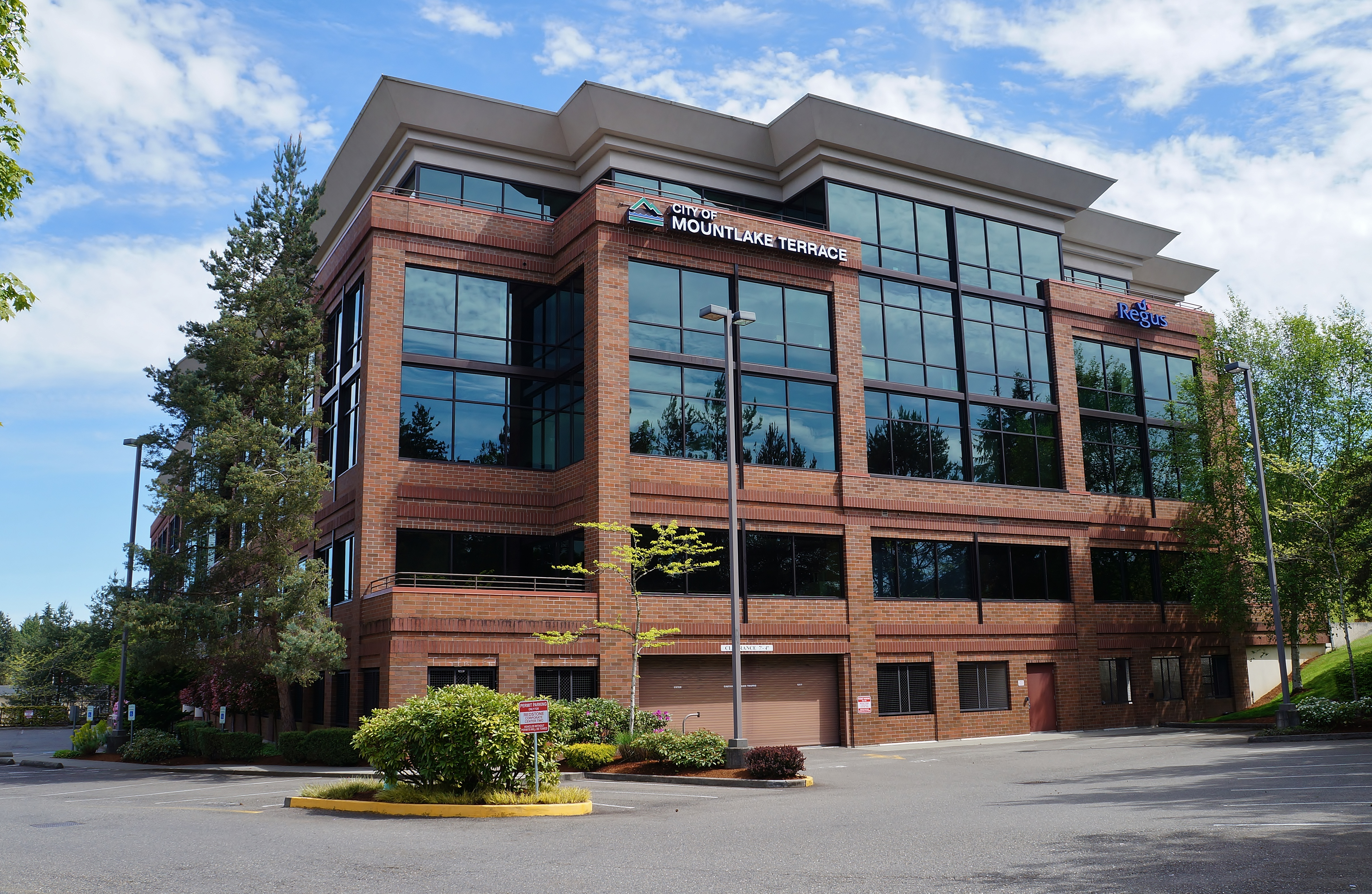
The interim city hall of Mountlake Terrace at an office park near Interstate 5

Mountlake Terrace is a noncharter incorporated code city with a council–manager form of government. The city council meets twice a month and has seven part-time members who are elected at-large in staggered four-year terms. The city manager is appointed by the city council to act as chief administrator of the city government and appoints the executives of city departments and programs. The city council also selects one of its members to serve as mayor, a largely ceremonial role that includes presiding over council meetings, for a two-year term.

Jeff Niten has served as the city manager of Mountlake Terrace since his appointment in April 2023. Councilmember Steve Woodard was elected mayor in January 2026 and will serve a two-year term. The city council also appoints citizens to serve on seven advisory boards: the Arts Advisory Commission, Civil Service Commission, Community Policing Advisory Board, Neighborhood Parks Improvement Subcommittee, Planning Commission, Recreation and Parks Advisory Commission, and Salary Commission.

The city government had an annual operating budget of $29 million in 2017 that is largely funded by property, sales, and utility taxes. It employs approximately 192 people who are organized into several departments that are overseen by the city manager and city council. Mountlake Terrace provides its own municipal services, including animal control, building inspection, zoning, public works, parks and recreation, tap water, sewage treatment, and a police department. The city government is based out of a city hall that opened in 2021 as part of a new civic campus in downtown, adjacent to Veterans Memorial Park. An interim city hall at an office park near Interstate 5 opened in 2008 after the previous city hall suffered a sudden roof collapse.

Other municipal services are provided from regional entities, including firefighting and emergency medical services from South County Fire, which inherited a contract signed by Mountlake Terrace with Fire District 1 in 2005. The city's inmates are sent to jails operated by Snohomish County or the City of Lynnwood, which also has a municipal court for Mountlake Terrace's police cases. The countywide Sno-Isle Libraries system oversees Mountlake Terrace's library, while the Edmonds School District operates public schools in the city.

At the federal level, Mountlake Terrace is part of the 1st congressional district, represented by Democrat Suzan DelBene. The district encompasses parts of Snohomish and King counties between Arlington and Bellevue that generally lie east of Interstate 5. The city had previously been part of the 2nd congressional district until 2022. At the state level, Mountlake Terrace is part of the 32nd legislative district, which also includes Lynnwood, Shoreline, Woodway, and portions of Edmonds and Seattle. The city is also part of the Snohomish County Council's 4th district, which also includes Brier, northern Bothell, and Mill Creek.

== Culture ==
Mountlake Terrace has an annual festival, known as Tour de Terrace, that is staged during the last weekend of July as part of the regional Seafair. It includes a parade, live music, a 5K run, vehicle shows, a carnival, and a fireworks display. The festival was established in 1993 by the city government ahead of a 40th anniversary celebration and is run by volunteers with support from the city. In 2017, the Tour de Terrace and its associated events in July attracted 70,000 visitors.

=== Arts ===
The city government adopted a percent for art program in the 1980s, funding arts projects from community groups and individuals for city projects. The municipal art collection is maintained by the Arts Advisory Commission. Mountlake Terrace is home to several bronze sculptures, including a pair of black bears cast in bronze at the library and a firefighter statue at a fire station.

The Arts Advisory Commission and Friends of the Arts sponsors an annual juried art show, named Arts of the Terrace, which was founded in 1978. The competition typically receives hundreds of entries and includes cash prizes. The city's lone movie theater was built for Regal Cinemas in 1994 and re-branded as a Cinebarre in 2009.

=== Parks and recreation ===
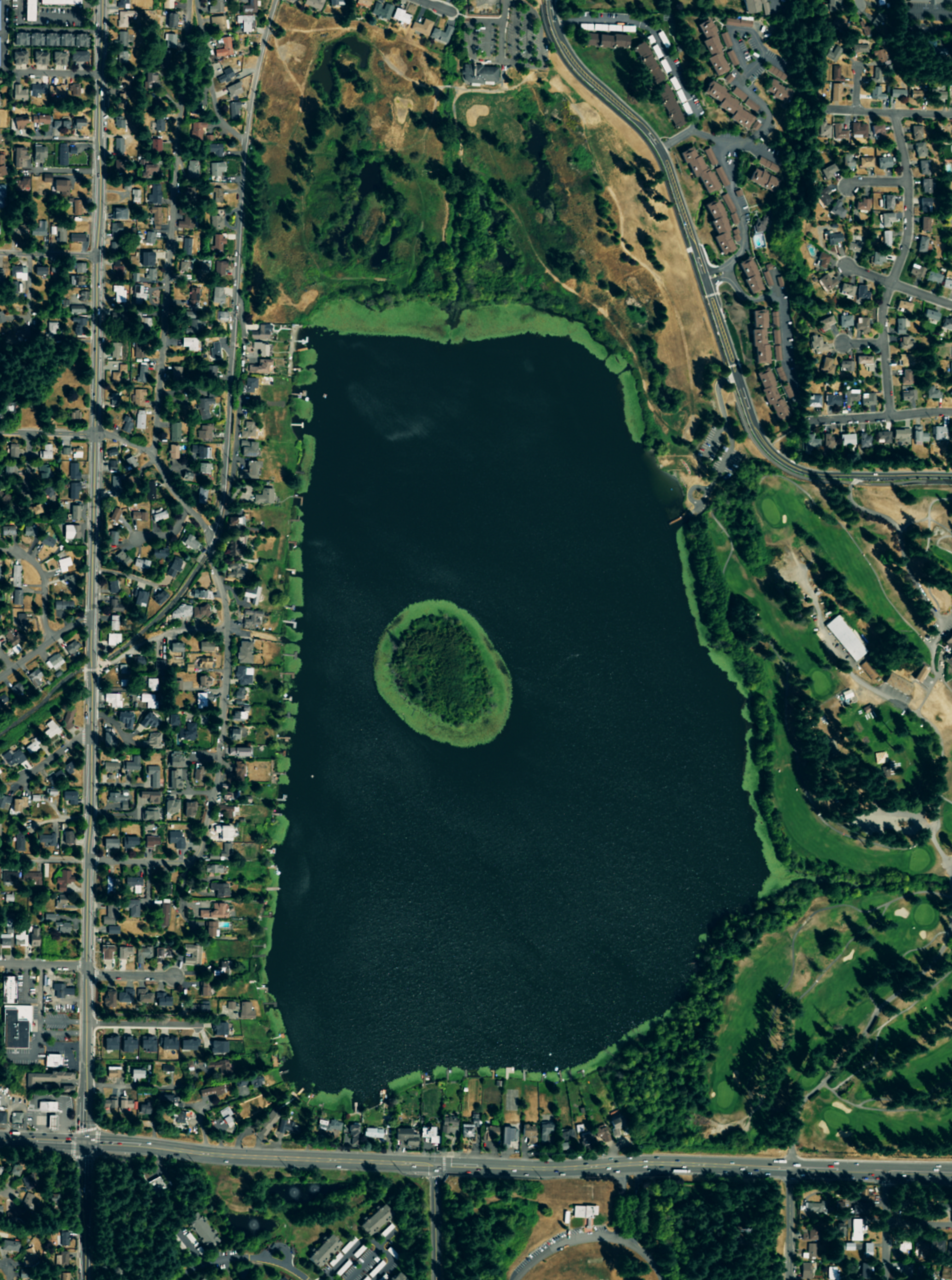
Aerial image of Lake Ballinger in 2017, showing the city park and part of the Nile Shrine golf course

Mountlake Terrace has 18 public parks with 262 acres (106 ha) of open space that is maintained by the city government. The city also partners with the Edmonds School District and privately owned recreation spaces to host events and activities for residents. The public and private parks have a total of 14 baseball fields, 13 soccer fields, 19 playgrounds, 15 tennis courts, and 4 indoor basketball courts. The main community center in the Mountlake Terrace is the Recreation Pavilion, which opened on November 26, 1968, and includes several swimming pools, a lazy river, racquetball courts, and an indoor gymnasium. The facility was renovated in 2003 and has been the subject of replacement or expansion plans that were not realized.

Terrace Creek Park is the city's largest, at 60 acres (24 ha), and includes hiking trails, open fields, and a disc golf course. It is located adjacent to the Recreation Pavilion and straddles the boundary between the Town Center and Cedar Terrace neighborhood along a section of Lyon Creek. The west side of the Town Center is home to Veterans Memorial Park, an 8-acre (3.2 ha) forested area near Interstate 5 with hiking trails and a playground.

The city government's former golf course was converted into Ballinger Park in 2013, located on 42 acres (17 ha) on the north end of Lake Ballinger. The park includes a boat launch, a fishing pier, swimming areas, sports fields, and Edmount Island. The Nile Shrine had built their own golf course on the east side of the lake in 1968 and opened it to the public in 1996, which drew people from the municipal course. The park is adjacent to the Interurban Trail, an inter-city hiking and cycling trail developed in the late 1990s that travels between Seattle and Everett on the former interurban railway route. The privately owned Olympicview Ice Arena in Mountlake Terrace is home to the Washington Huskies college hockey team, the Seattle Totems junior hockey program, and other skating groups.

=== Media ===
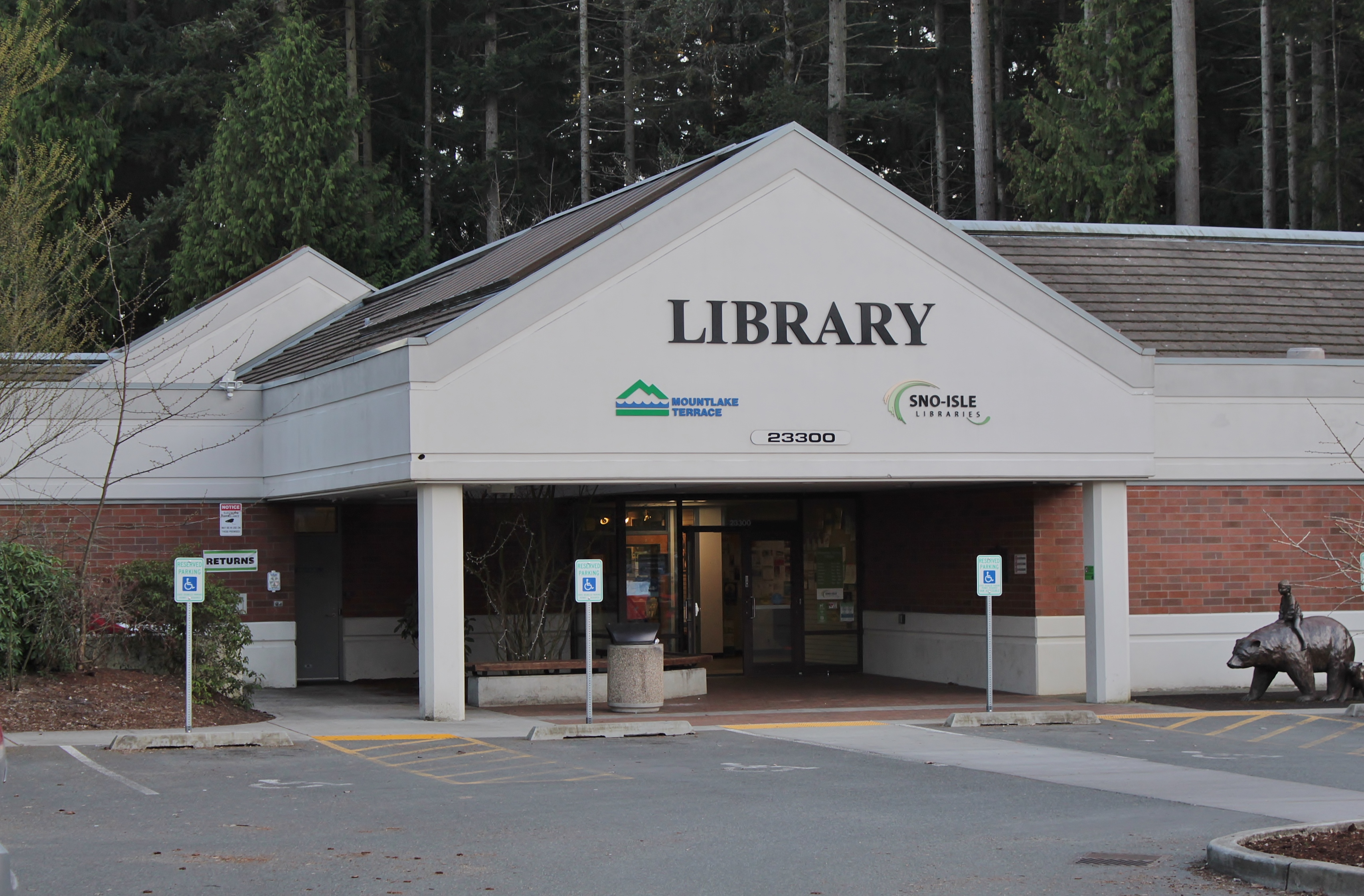
The city library, operated by Sno-Isle Libraries and opened in 1988

Mountlake Terrace is served by regional newspapers and television broadcasters as part of the Seattle-area media market. A local weekly newspaper, named The Enterprise, published a dedicated Mountlake Terrace edition from 1958 to 2009; it was owned by The Everett Herald and later folded into a regional newspaper before ceasing publication in 2012. MLTnews, a local blog, was founded in 2009 and acquired by My Edmonds News in 2012.

The city's public library has been managed by the regional Sno-Isle Libraries system since it was annexed in 1985. The former city-operated library had opened in 1976 at a closed elementary school that was also leased to a private school, but was determined to be too small to serve the community. The library building, located adjacent to Veterans Memorial Park, was opened on July 29, 1988, at a cost of $1.6 million (equivalent to $3.65 million in 2024 dollars).

=== Notable people ===
- Seamus Boxley, professional basketball player
- Maria Cantwell, U.S. Senator and former state legislator
- Ariana DeBoo, singer-songwriter
- Devante Downs, professional American football player
- Lily Gladstone, actress
- Lil Mosey, rapper
- Mark O'Connor, fiddler
- Esther Reed, fraudster
- Dino Rossi, former state legislator and gubernatorial candidate
- Ryan Strieby, professional baseball player
- Xavier Videau, competitive figure skater and coach
- Aaron Ybarra, perpetrator of the 2014 Otto Miller Hall shooting

== Education ==
The city's public schools are part of the Edmonds School District, which serves most of South Snohomish County, including the neighboring cities of Edmonds, Lynnwood, and Woodway. The district has 41 total schools and an enrollment of over 21,000 students in 2018–19. Mountlake Terrace has five schools that are operated by the district: one high school, one middle school, and three elementary schools. Mountlake Terrace High School was opened in 1960 and rebuilt in 1991 at the same campus, located in the northeast corner of the city. The former high school building had an unusual circular gymnasium, named the "Hawk Dome", which had floor-to-ceiling windows.

The nearest post-secondary education institutions are Edmonds College, a community college in Lynnwood, and the University of Washington at Bothell. Mountlake Terrace is also home to three private schools: the Brighton Evergreen School, the Cedar Park Christian School, and the St Pius X Catholic School.

== Infrastructure ==
=== Transportation ===
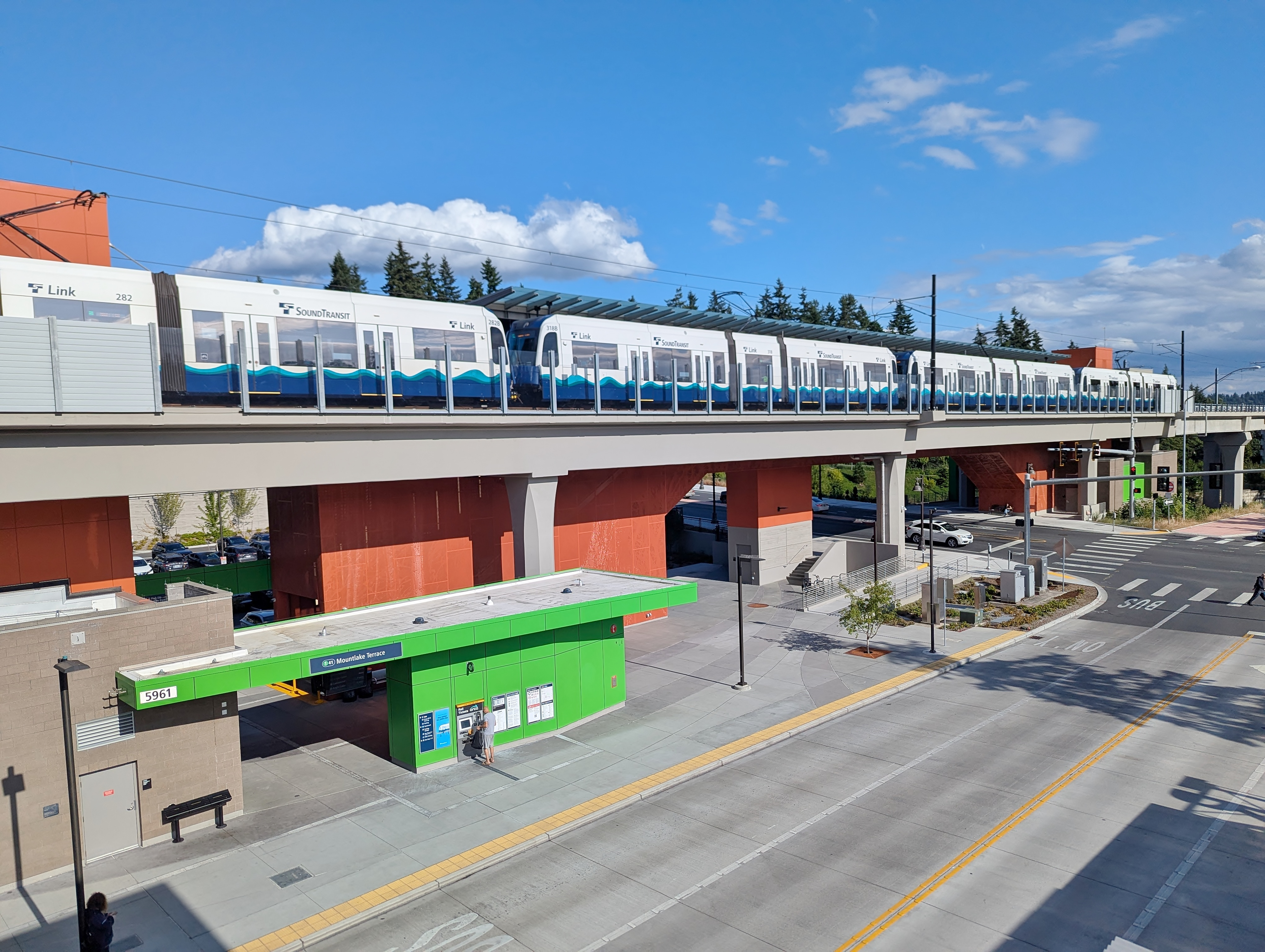
Mountlake Terrace station, a major bus hub and light rail station

Mountlake Terrace is located 13 miles (21 km) north of Downtown Seattle on Interstate 5, which has interchanges at State Route 104 (244th Street Southwest), 236th Street Southwest, and 220th Street Southwest. State Route 104 is a major highway that connects the city to Lake Forest Park and Edmonds, where it continues via a state ferry to the Kitsap Peninsula. The city's western boundary also reaches State Route 99, which continues south to Seattle and north to Everett. Mountlake Terrace also has several major north–south arterial streets that continue into Lynnwood and Shoreline.

The city's public transportation is primarily provided by Community Transit, which also serves most of the county, and Sound Transit, a regional agency. Community Transit operates local routes that connect Mountlake Terrace's neighborhoods to Edmonds, Lynnwood, and Brier. The main transit hub in the city is Mountlake Terrace station, which opened in 2009 and has 890 parking stalls in its garage and surface lot. It is served by Sound Transit's regional Link light rail system, which was extended to Lynnwood in August 2024 and connects Mountlake Terrace to the University District, Downtown Seattle, the Eastside, and Seattle–Tacoma International Airport. King County Metro operates local bus service to the station from Shoreline, Lake Forest Park, and Kenmore.

=== Utilities ===
The city's electric power is provided by the Snohomish County Public Utility District (PUD), a consumer-owned public utility that serves all of Snohomish County. Puget Sound Energy provides natural gas service to the Mountlake Terrace residents and businesses. The city government contracts with Waste Management for curbside garbage, recycling, and yard waste collection and disposal. A county transfer station is also located in Mountlake Terrace.

Mountlake Terrace is part of the Alderwood Water and Wastewater District, which provides tap water and sewage treatment services to most of southern Snohomish County. The water district sources its drinking water from the Spada Lake reservoir in the Cascade Mountains, which is treated and fluoridated by the City of Everett at the Chaplain Reservoir. The city government maintains a 2.5-million-US-gallon (9,500 kl) water tank at Jack Block Park that has reserve capacity for fires and boosting water pressure. Sewage from Mountlake Terrace is primarily sent to the City of Edmonds for treatment and discharge into Puget Sound, with overflow treated at the regional Brightwater facility near Maltby by King County Metro.

=== Healthcare ===
The city's nearest general hospital is the Edmonds branch of the Swedish Medical Center, located on State Route 99. Mountlake Terrace is part of the public hospital district, which operated the independent Stevens Hospital until it was acquired by Swedish in 2010. While the city has no general medical clinics, The Everett Clinic and public health provider Community Health Centers have identified Mountlake Terrace as a potential future market.
