= Lake Ballinger =

Lake in Snohomish County, Washington, USA

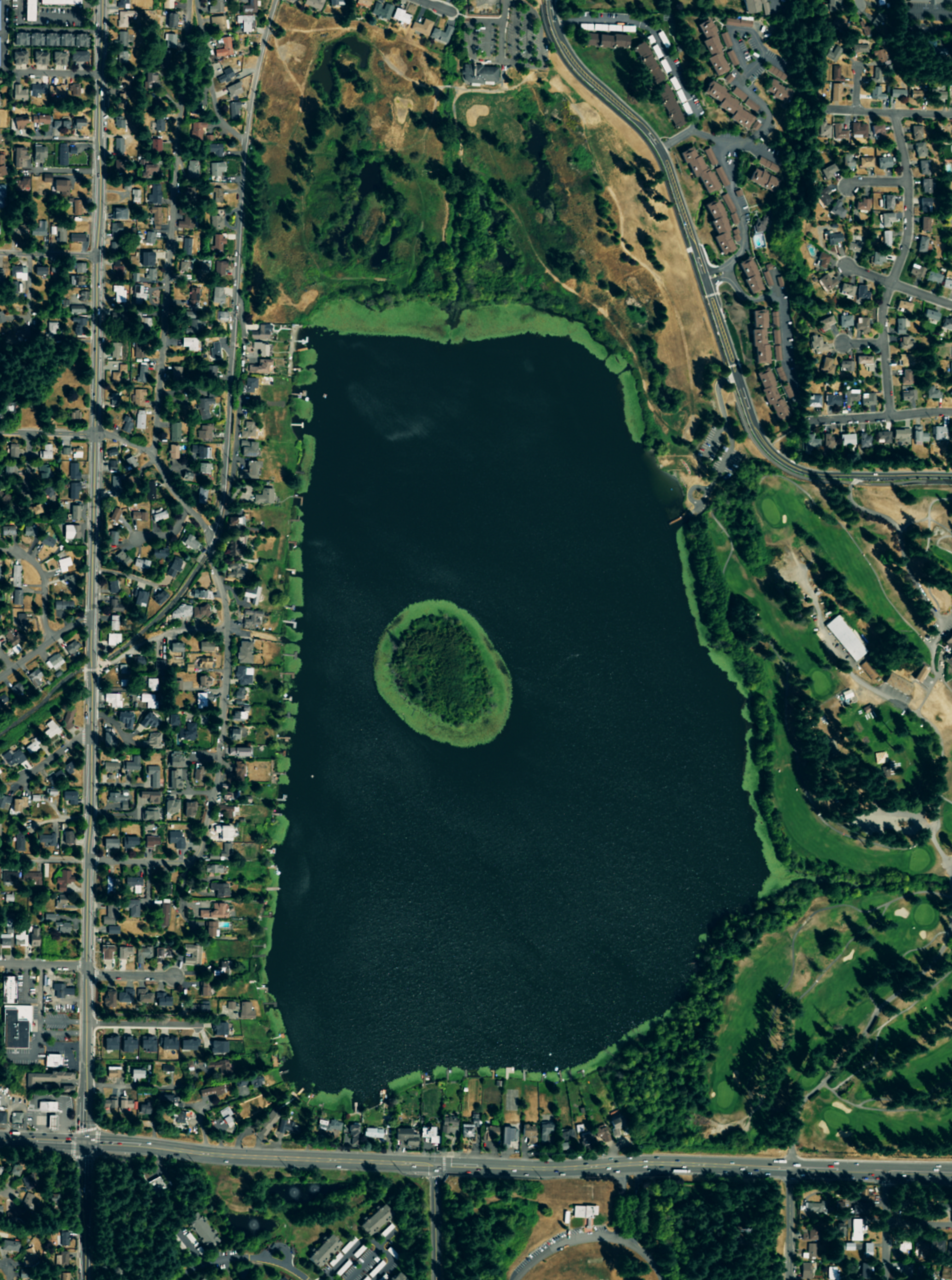
- Aerial image, 2017

- Location within Washington (state) Location within the United States
- Location: Snohomish County, Washington, U.S.
- Coordinates: 47°46′53″N 122°19′22″W
- Primary inflows: Hall Creek
- Primary outflows: McAleer Creek
- Catchment area: 3,250 acres (13.2 km^{2})
- Basin countries: United States
- Max. length: .58 mi (0.93 km)
- Max. width: .37 mi (0.60 km)
- Surface area: 103 acres (42 ha)
- Average depth: 15 ft (4.6 m)
- Max. depth: 35 ft (11 m)
- Surface elevation: 292 ft (89 m)
- Islands: Edmount Island
- Settlements: Mountlake Terrace; Edmonds

Lake Ballinger is a freshwater lake with a surface area of 103 acres in southern Snohomish County, Washington. It is bordered by the cities of Mountlake Terrace to the east and Edmonds to the west. It is fed by Hall Creek at its north end and its outflow is McAleer Creek at its east end, going on to feed Lake Washington.

The lake was formerly called McAleer Lake after logger Hugh McAleer, who was the previous owner of the lake and surrounding lands. It received its present name in 1901 when it was purchased by Richard A. Ballinger, future United States Secretary of the Interior, who named it after his father, Richard Ballinger.

== Description ==
Lake Ballinger is a natural lake formed by the melting of the Puget Sound lobe of the Cordilleran Ice Sheet. It is fed primarily by Hall Creek (which is sourced from Hall Lake), but is also fed by groundwater flowing from nearby Echo Lake as well as by surface runoff. It is just west of Interstate 5 in Mountlake Terrace and immediately north of the boundary between Snohomish and King Counties, three miles north of Seattle. Lying in the Puget Sound lowlands (around 2.7 miles east of Puget Sound itself), its surface elevation is 292 feet.

Lake Ballinger is wide and oval-shaped, oriented north to south, with a fairly straight western bank and a wide protrusion in its southeastern portion where it drains into McAleer Creek. Near the center of the lake is Edmount Island, a three-acre peat island. The site of houses at two separate times in the past, today it is part of Mountlake Terrace's Ballinger Park.

The lake is 0.58 miles long and 0.37 miles across at its widest, covering 107 acres including the island, the actual water surface area being approximately 103 acres. Its greatest depth is 35 feet.

== History ==
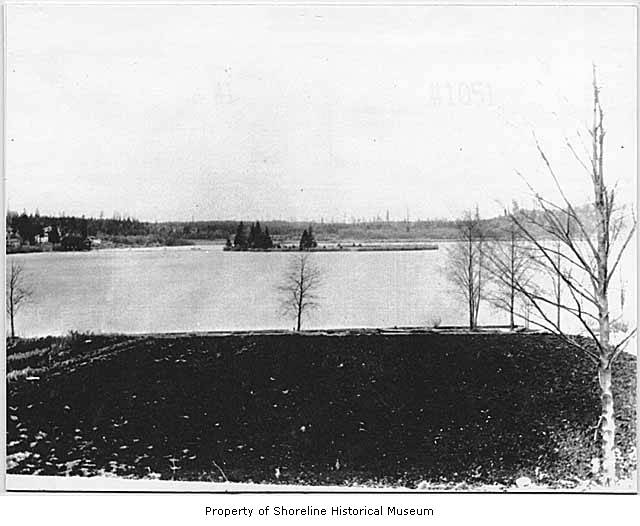
Lake Ballinger c. 1925

Lake Ballinger was originally called Lake McAleer after Hugh McAleer, its first owner. McAleer was a logger and the proprietor of much of the land surrounding the lake. One Bartholomew family had a homestead on the island beginning in 1888, until the 1901 purchase of the land by Richard A. Ballinger. Ballinger renamed the lake after his father, a Civil War veteran. He used the lake to store logs before being floated down McAleer Creek to Lake Washington for shipment. In 1914, Ballinger began selling plots along the lake's western shore with the intention of establishing a residential development.

In 1972, Lake Ballinger was found to have the poorest water quality out of 34 Puget Sound area lakes that were surveyed for quality. One of the most significant problems contributing to its poor state was algae growth arising from phosphorus pollution, which resulted in hypoxia. In the following decades, a series of steps were taken to mitigate water quality issues. In 1980, sedimentation ponds were built along Hall Creek to allow some of the pollutants destined for the lake to settle. Two years later, a hypolimnetic aeration system was installed to introduce oxygen from the air to the lower strata of the lake. In 1991, Mountlake Terrace received approval to treat the water with alum to reduce nutrient levels.

Lake Ballinger experienced a major flood of over six feet above its normal elevation on New Year's Day 1997, damaging several waterfront homes. This same flood caused the overflow of a nearby sewer line into the lake. A similar incident occurred in December 2007, flooding three homes and causing sewage contamination from three separate leaks.

On July 29, 2009, coals from a barbecue ignited brush on Edmount Island. In the fire that resulted, one firefighter was injured. The peat smoldered for several days, until the last hot spot was extinguished on August 9. The island remains closed to the public indefinitely.

== Ecology ==
Lake Ballinger suffers from a number of ecological issues. Urban runoff introduces petroleum, heavy metals, and excess nutrients to the water. Fecal coliform levels are elevated due to the presence of domestic pets and large numbers of geese, a problem addressed with the practice of egg addling. Excess nutrients cause algae growth, resulting in a loss of oxygen at the bottom levels of the lake when dead algae decomposes.

Lake Ballinger is a Washington Department of Fish and Wildlife Priority Habitat.

== See also ==
- List of lakes in Washington
- Mountlake Terrace, Washington
- Edmonds, Washington
