= Everett Carnegie Library =

- U.S. National Register of Historic Places
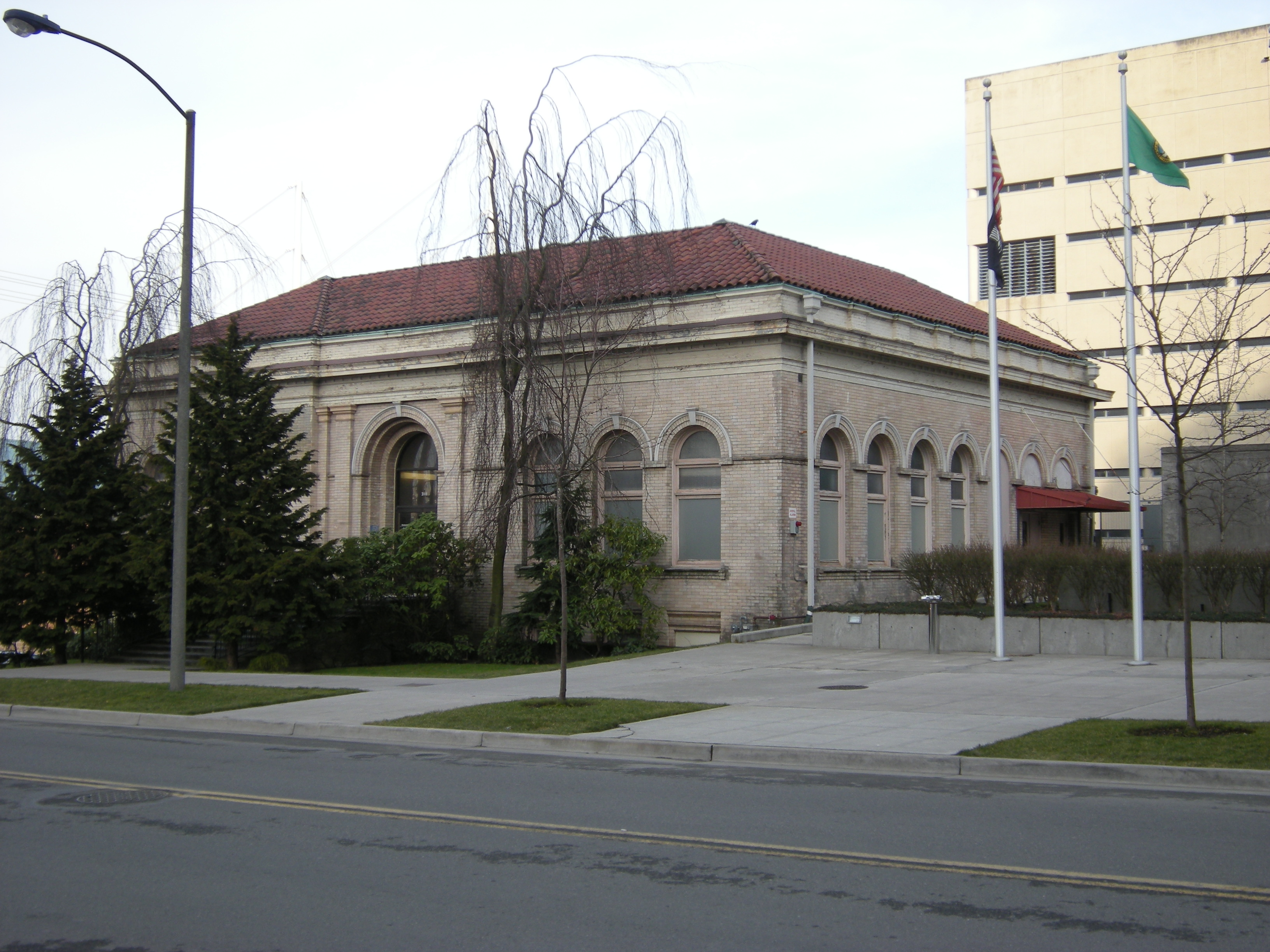
- The library's exterior in 2009

- Location within Washington (state)
- Location: 3001 Oakes Ave., Everett, Washington, USA
- Coordinates: 47.978°N 122.204°W
- Built: 1904–1905
- Architect: Heide, August P.; deNeuf, Emil
- Architectural style: Second Renaissance Revival
- NRHP reference No.: 75001868
- Added to NRHP: December 6, 1975

The Everett Carnegie Library is a Carnegie library building located in Everett, Washington, USA listed on the National Register of Historic Places and part of the Snohomish County Government campus. The building occupies the southeast corner of the intersection of Oakes Avenue and Wall Street in the city's central business district.

== History ==
It was constructed in 1904 with a gift of US$25,000 from philanthropist Andrew Carnegie for the purpose of constructing a public library. The architectural firm of Heide and deNeuf designed the building using the Pomona, California Public Library and Boston Public Library as its models. The library opened on July 1, 1905, with a newly purchased stock of 4,000 volumes on its shelves. It operated until 1935, when it was superseded by the new Everett Public Library at 2702 Hoyt Avenue which opened in October 1934. The building became the Cassidy Funeral Home from 1935 to 1980. Snohomish County took ownership in 1980, installing the offices of the County Executive. Subsequently, the building was occupied by the Snohomish County Museum of History, a three-year arrangement that ended in 2011 when lease negotiations with the county failed. Although it is part of the Snohomish County Government Complex, the building stood vacant for several years.

In 2018, the Carnegie Building was repurposed for use as a social services facility to treat homelessness and drug use.

== See also ==
- List of Carnegie libraries in the United States
- National Register of Historic Places listings in Snohomish County, Washington
