= Whitehorse Trail =

Rail trail in Snohomish County, Washington

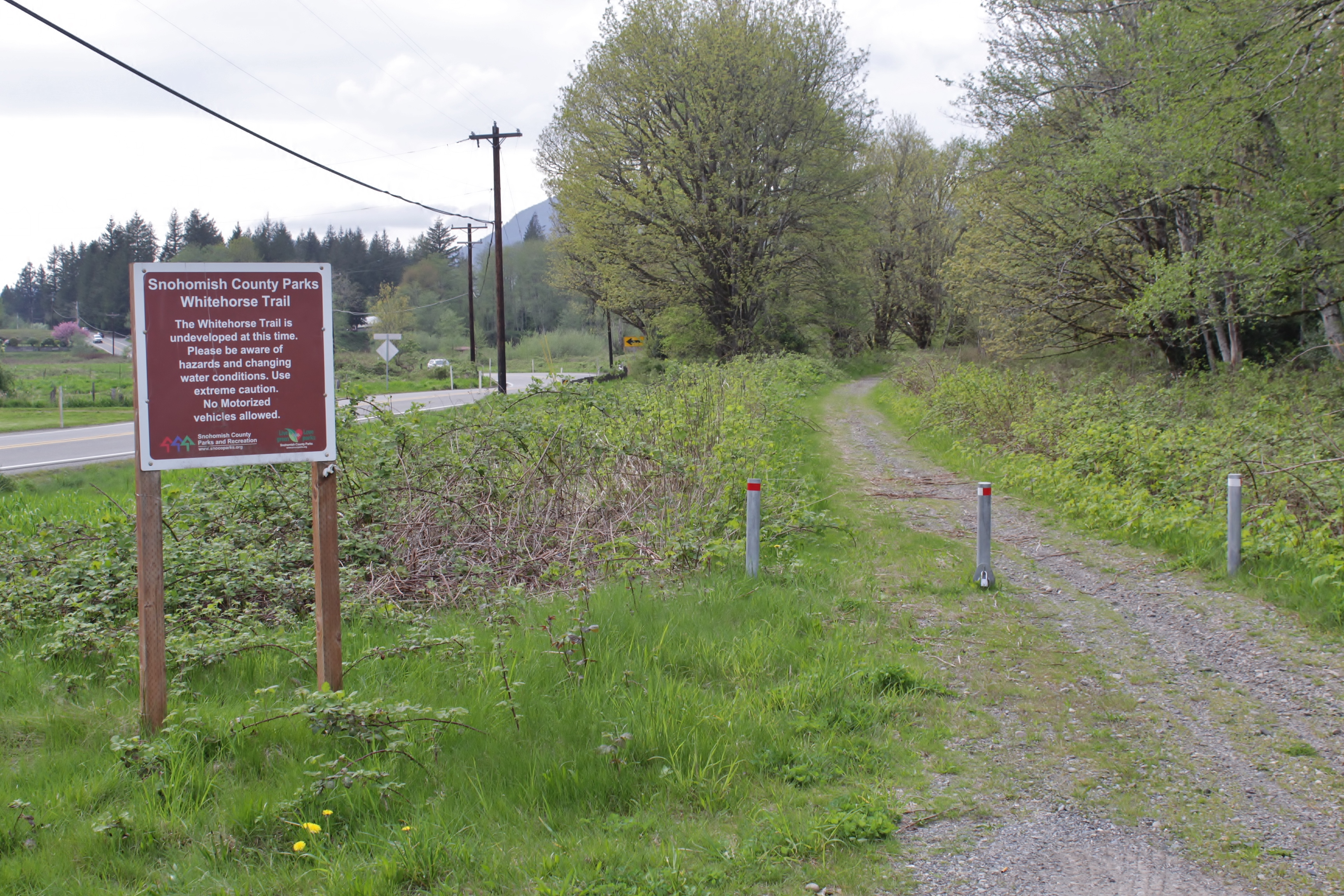
- An unpaved section near Oso
- Length: 27 miles (43 km)
- Location: Snohomish County, Washington
- Established: 2002
- Trailheads: Arlington, Trafton, Oso, Darrington
- Use: Hiking, cycling, horseback riding
- Surface: Compacted gravel
- Right of way: Northern Pacific Railway spur
- Website: Whitehorse Regional Trail
Trail map

The Whitehorse Trail is a rail trail in northern Snohomish County, Washington, connecting the cities of Arlington and Darrington. The 27-mile-long (43 km) trail uses a former Northern Pacific Railway spur built in 1901 and abandoned in 1990. The trail has been in development since the county government purchased it in 1993, with some sections open to the public.

The trail's name is derived from the "Whitehorse Express", the historic name of the railroad, which in turn was named for Whitehorse Mountain.

== Route ==
The western terminus of the Whitehorse Trail is in Arlington, at a junction with the Centennial Trail on the north side of the Stillaguamish River at the confluence with its two forks. The Centennial Trail continues north towards Bryant and south towards Snohomish along another former rail corridor. The Whitehorse Trail continues northeast, following the North Fork Stillaguamish River upstream to a trailhead in Trafton, where it crosses the river on a historic trestle bridge. The trail turns east, following State Route 530 on the south side of the North Fork, towards Oso. The trail, 5 miles (8.0 km) east of Oso, passes a memorial to victims of the 2014 Oso mudslide, which had destroyed a section of the trail's corridor. From Oso continuing towards Darrington, the Whitehorse Trail passes through the historic towns of Fortson and Hazel, and the modern community of Swede Heaven, which hosts a trailhead. The trail splits north of downtown Darrington, with one branch heading northeast to Whitehorse Community Park on the Sauk River and another heading south to Railroad Avenue in downtown, passing Darrington Municipal Airport.

The majority of the planned trail will be 12 feet (3.7 m) wide and have a surface of compacted gravel. It has been designated for use by walkers, cyclists and horseback riders.

== History ==
The Northern Pacific Railway, owners of the railroad through Arlington, built a 28-mile (45 km) branch line to Darrington in 1901. The railroad primarily delivered lumber from Darrington and intermediate sawmills to Arlington, Everett and other towns, but also carried weekly passenger service. In 1970, the Northern Pacific was acquired by Burlington Northern, who continued to run a declining number of lumber trains on the branch as Darrington's remaining sawmill switched to truck transport.

In November 1990, major floods in the Stillaguamish River basin left the railroad damaged and unusable, leading to its formal abandonment by Burlington Northern. The county government debated acquiring the railroad for use as either a recreational trail or a scenic railroad, the latter requiring millions spent in repairs. In November 1993, the Snohomish County Council approved $550,000 paid to Burlington Northern to acquire 515 acres (208 ha) on the corridor, with the intent of converting into a recreational trail. The first section of the trail, named the Whitehorse Trail, opened in 2002 near Darrington and covered 7 miles (11 km) of the planned 27-mile (43 km) trail.

An unfinished section of the trail was destroyed during the Oso mudslide on March 22, 2014, along with State Route 530. In the aftermath of the mudslide, which killed 43 people, the Whitehorse Trail became a key project in the recovery of the area, employing local workers and drawing tourists. A $75,000 grant from the State of Washington, along with private donations, funded the cleanup of 15 miles (24 km) of the trail and repair of older bridges. A 9.5-mile-long (15.3 km) segment of the Whitehorse Trail from Oso to Cicero Pond was expected to be completed in 2018, using $4.24 million in funds from the county government, Washington State Department of Transportation and Federal Emergency Management Agency (FEMA). Rebuilding of the section destroyed by the Oso mudslide was completed in 2016, using FEMA funds. Later landslides damaged sections near Trafton and Darrington. They are scheduled to be repaired by 2027 along with a resurfacing of the westernmost 3 miles (4.8 km) to formally connect the Whitehorse Trail to the Centennial Trail.
