= Mount Higgins =

North American landform of the North Cascades

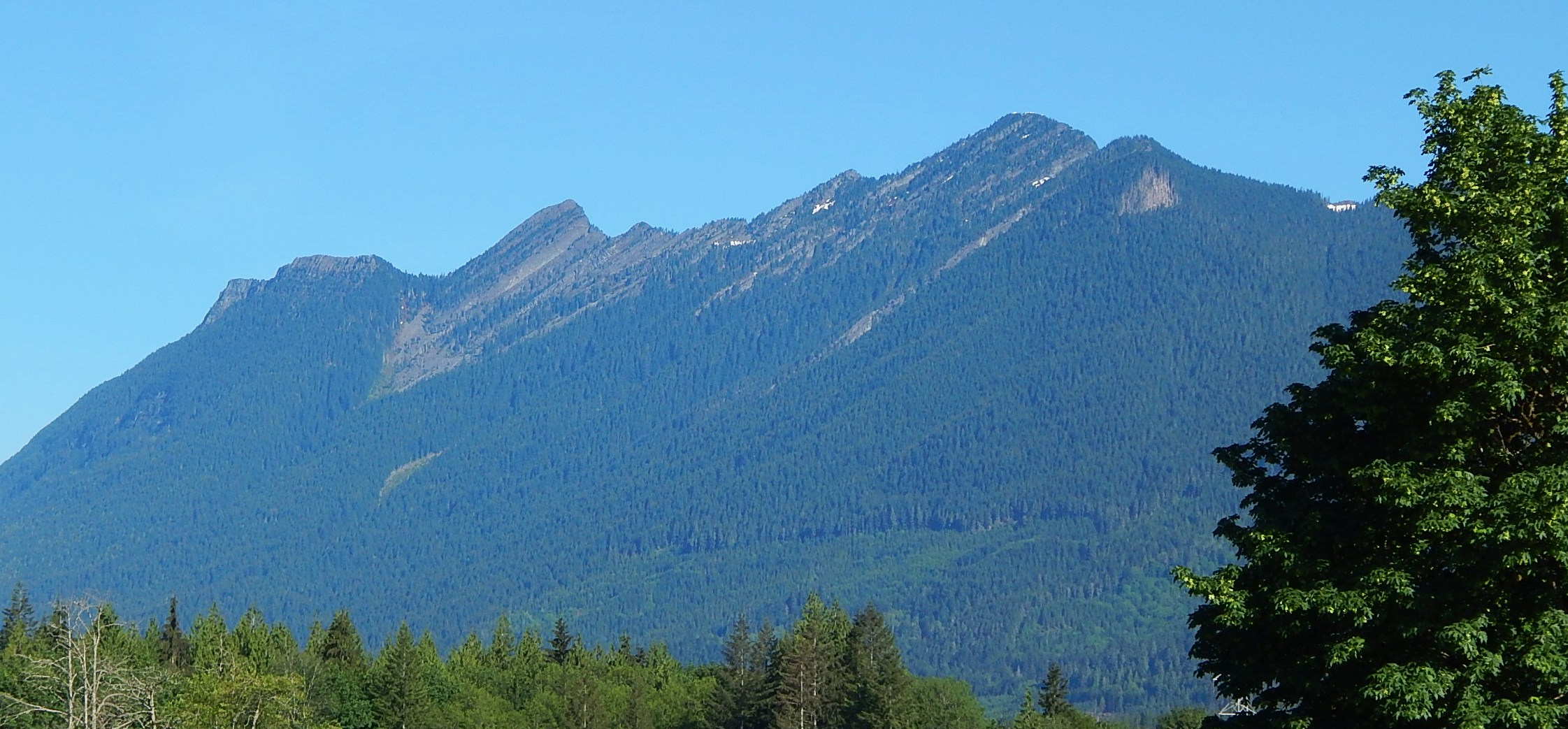
- Mount Higgins seen from Darrington

Highest point
- Elevation: 5,176 ft (1,578 m)
- Prominence: 896 ft (273 m)
- Parent peak: Round Mountain (5,340 ft)
- Isolation: 0.95 mi (1.53 km)
- Coordinates: 48°18′54″N 121°45′45″W

Geography
- Location within Washington (state) Location within the United States
- Country: United States
- State: Washington
- County: Skagit
- Parent range: Cascade Range
- Topo map: USGS Mount Higgins

Climbing
- First ascent: 1888
- Easiest route: Scramble

Mount Higgins is a 5,176-foot-elevation mountain summit located at the western edge of the North Cascades Range, in Skagit County, Washington. Mount Higgins has two subsidiary summits, Skadulgwas Peak (4,986 ft) which is the fin-shaped middle peak, and also Mount Higgins Lookout Site (4,849 ft), the western sub-summit. The mountain is set on land administered by the Mount Baker–Snoqualmie National Forest. Mount Higgins is situated along the north side of State Route 530, mid-way between the communities of Darrington and Oso, near the site of the 2014 Oso mudslide. The nearest higher neighbor is Round Mountain, 0.93 miles (1.50 km) to the north-northeast. This mountain is named for Oso homesteader Walter Higgins. The first ascent was made in 1888 by John Higgins, Frank Lawrence, and Al Baker. Precipitation runoff from Mount Higgins drains into tributaries of the Stillaguamish River. Topographic relief is significant as the south aspect rises 4,800 feet (1,500 m) above the Stillaguamish in two miles.

== Climate ==
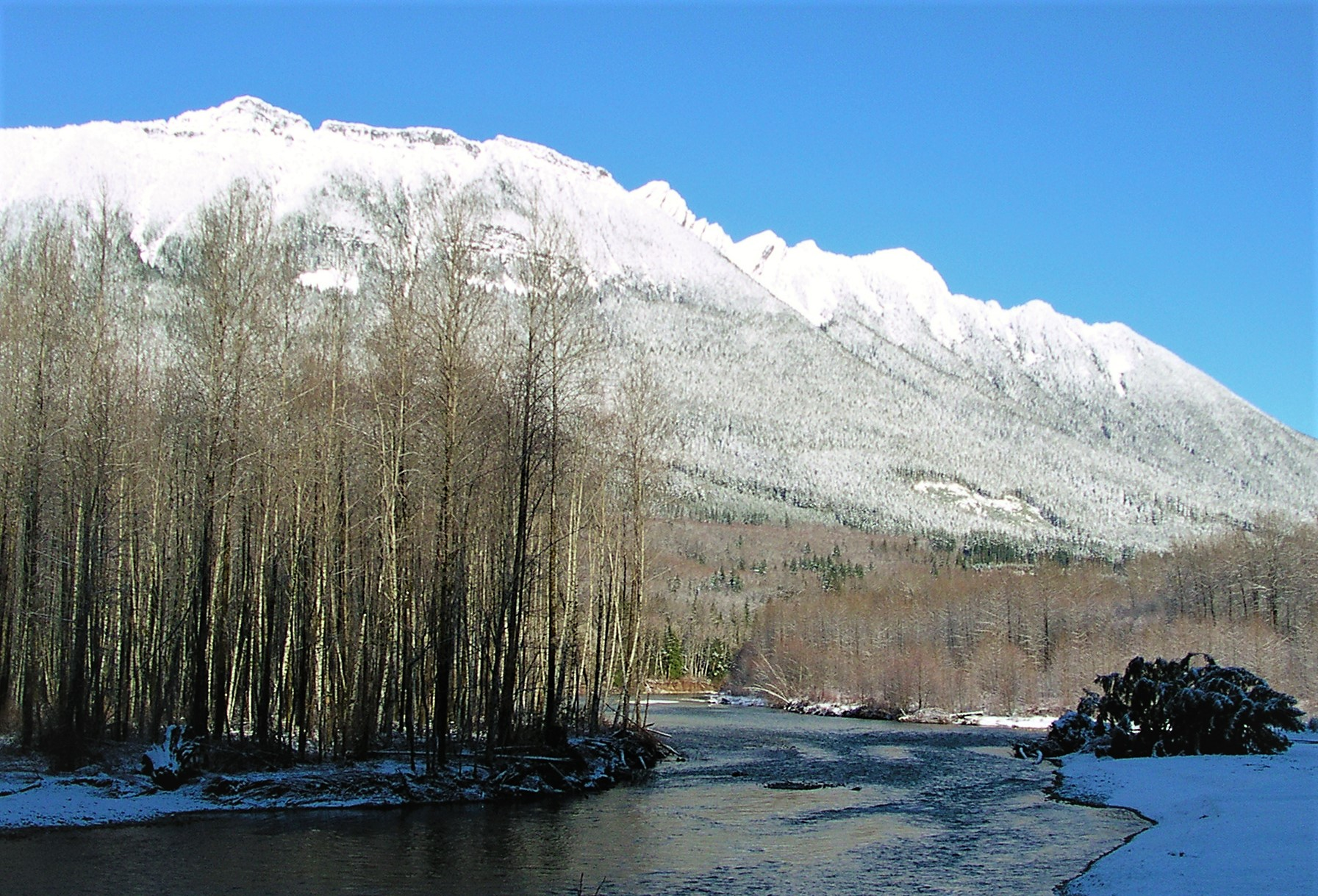
Mt. Higgins in winter

Mount Higgins is located in the marine west coast climate zone of western North America. Most weather fronts coming off the Pacific Ocean travel northeast toward the Cascade Mountains. As fronts approach the North Cascades, they are forced upward by the peaks of the Cascade Range (orographic lift), causing them to drop their moisture in the form of rain or snowfall onto the Cascades. As a result, the west side of the North Cascades experiences high precipitation, especially during the winter months in the form of snowfall. During winter months, weather is usually cloudy, but, due to high pressure systems over the Pacific Ocean that intensify during summer months, there is often little or no cloud cover during the summer.

== Geology ==
The North Cascades features some of the most rugged topography in the Cascade Range with craggy peaks, ridges, and deep glacial valleys. Geological events occurring many years ago created the diverse topography and drastic elevation changes over the Cascade Range leading to the various climate differences. These climate differences lead to vegetation variety defining the ecoregions in this area.

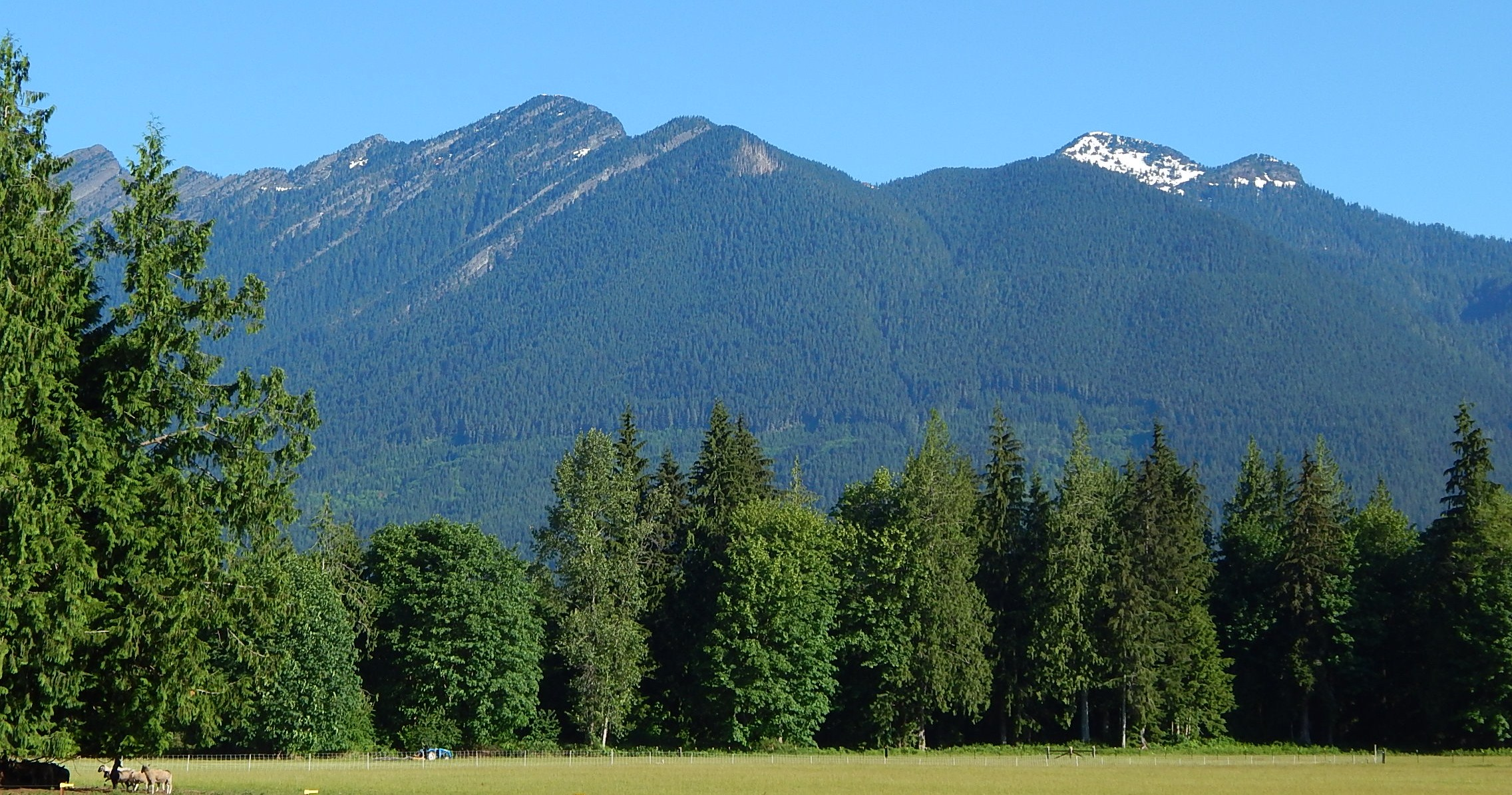
Mt. Higgins (left). Top of Round Mountain visible to right

The history of the formation of the Cascade Mountains dates back millions of years ago to the late Eocene Epoch. With the North American Plate overriding the Pacific Plate, episodes of volcanic igneous activity persisted. In addition, small fragments of the oceanic and continental lithosphere called terranes created the North Cascades about 50 million years ago.

During the Pleistocene period dating back over two million years ago, glaciation advancing and retreating repeatedly scoured the landscape leaving deposits of rock debris. The U-shaped cross section of the river valleys is a result of recent glaciation. Uplift and faulting in combination with glaciation have been the dominant processes which have created the tall peaks and deep valleys of the North Cascades area.

== See also ==
- Geography of the North Cascades
