= Stillaguamish people =

Lushootseed-speaking people from Western Washington

Stillaguamish
stuləgʷabš
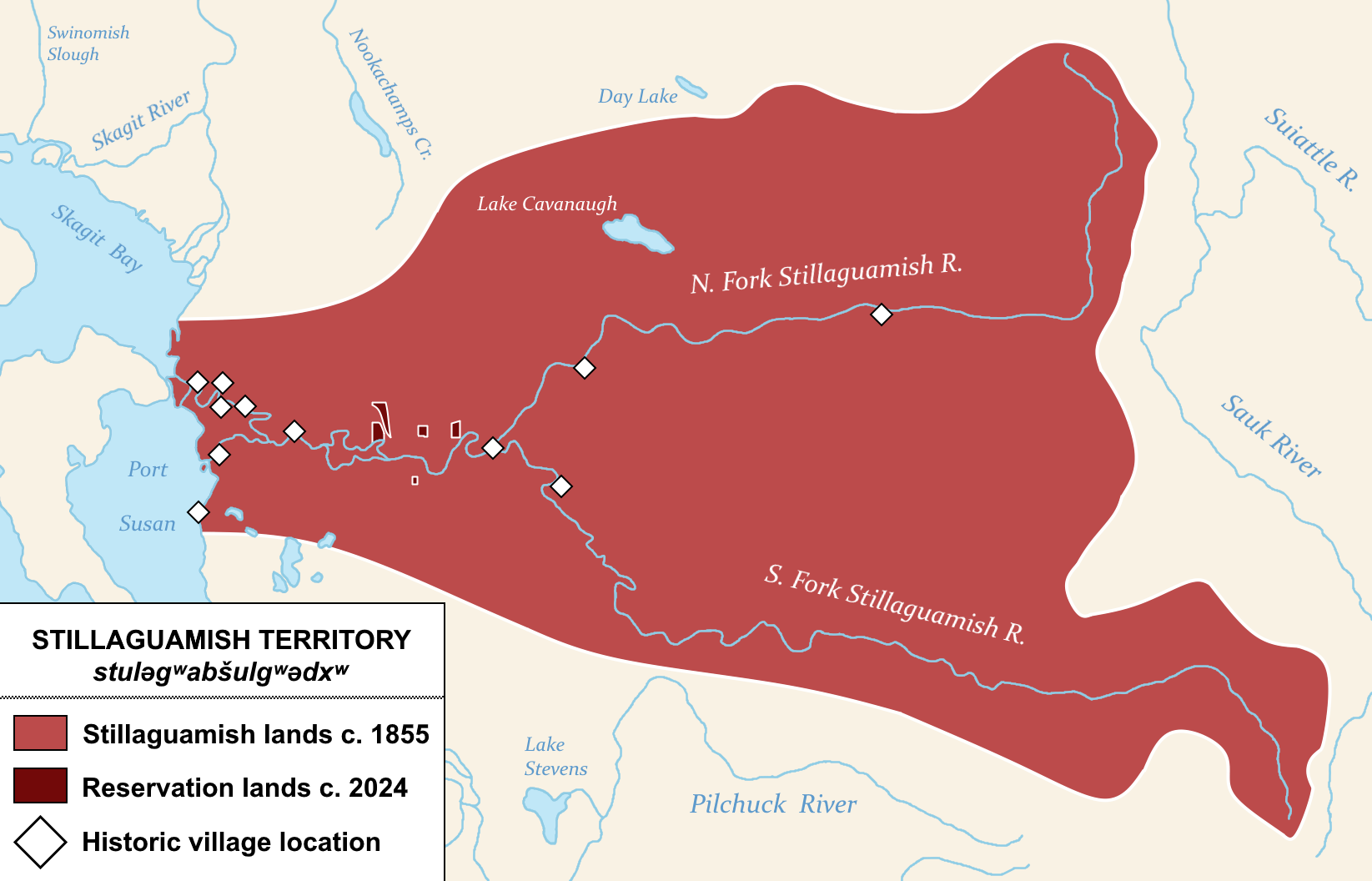
- Stillaguamish territory in 1855 and 2023

Total population
- 237

Regions with significant populations
- Washington, United States

Languages
- Lushootseed, English

Religion
- Traditional tribal religion and Christianity, incl. syncretic forms

Related ethnic groups
- other Lushootseed-speaking peoples

The Stillaguamish people (stil-ə-GWAH-mish; Lushootseed: stuləgʷabš) are a Southern Coast Salish people Indigenous to the Stillaguamish River valley in northwestern Washington State in the United States, near the city of Arlington, Washington. The Stillaguamish speak Northern Lushootseed, a Coast Salish language. Although usage of the language has declined, there are ongoing revitalization efforts by the Stillaguamish Tribe.

The Stillaguamish emerged after the end of the last glacial maximum, settling what is now the Stillaguamish River valley after the ice melted. For thousands of years, the Stillaguamish have lived along the Stillaguamish River. The modern Stillaguamish nation descends from the aboriginal Stillaguamish peoples who signed the Treaty of Point Elliot in 1855 as the Stoluck-wa-mish River Tribe. Although they were promised a reservation in the treaty, they were not given one, so while some Stillaguamish moved to Tulalip, the majority of Stillaguamish remained in their traditional territory. In 1976, the Stillaguamish Tribe of Indians was granted federal recognition, with a reservation being created in 2014. Today, most Stillaguamish people are enrolled in the Stillaguamish Tribe, while others are enrolled in the Tulalip Tribes.

== Name ==
The name "Stillaguamish" is an anglicization of their Lushootseed endonym, stuləgʷabš. The Lushootseed name means "people of the river," from the root word stuləkʷ meaning "river" and the suffix =abš meaning "people." The name stuləgʷabš is a drainage term, referring not to a central village but to all the people living along the Stillaguamish River.

== History ==
The Stillaguamish people and their ancestors have lived in the region for thousands of years. Although the first humans could have arrived in the Pacific Northwest as early as 30,000 years ago, the first permanent human habitation of western Washington began 12,000 to 13,000 years ago after the last glacial maximum ended and the Vashon Glacier retreated. Archaeological sites dating back to the Olcott Phase (~9000 YBP) attributed to Stillaguamish Paleo-Indian ancestors have been discovered in Arlington and Granite Falls.

For thousands of years, the Stillaguamish have lived along the Stillaguamish River, fishing in it and its tributaries and hunting the surrounding country. The Stillaguamish were historically closely tied with neighboring peoples, such as the Snohomish, Sauk, and Skagit. Some Stillaguamish people were allied with peoples as far south as the Duwamish or even over the mountains from the plateau peoples. Warfare was uncommon, and generally defensive, as a retaliation for murder, broken promises, territory violations, or raiding.

Because of the Stillaguamish River's remoteness, the Stillaguamish did not have much contact from Europeans prior to the signing of the Treaty.

On January 22, 1855, the Stillaguamish were party to the Treaty of Point Elliot, listed as the "Stoluck-wa-mish." Although the Stillaguamish attended the signing and were listed on the treaty, they, along with one-third of the other tribes, were not included as signatories. The Stillaguamish were not included as signatories on the treaty because they were purposely placed as subjects of the Snoqualmie and their leader Patkanim. Anthropologist Barbara Lane concluded that, during the hastily conducted treaty negotiations, the Stillaguamish were likely completely overlooked by Issaac Stevens, the Territorial Governor at the time. It was Stevens' policy to lump together as many tribes as possible, so as to sign as few treaties as possible.

Despite being promised a reservation by then-Indian Agent Michael Simmons, no reservation was originally established in their homeland. Instead, the Stillaguamish were instructed to move to the Tulalip Reservation. While some moved to the Tulalip Reservation, many others resisted moving and stayed in their homelands along the Stillaguamish River. Some of those who moved to Tulalip were prevented from settling there, in part due to rampant disease at Tulalip, as well as a lack of land for all the people there, and eventually returned to their homelands. In 1881, only 3 Stillaguamish had remained at Tulalip, whose descendants make up the Stillaguamish community of Tulalip.

During the Puget Sound War, temporary reservations were created to further pacify the Indigenous peoples. The Stillaguamish were overlooked in the process, and a reservation was not set up for the Stillaguamish. In May 1856, the Stillaguamish were forced to move to the temporary reservation at Holmes Harbor on Whidbey Island, which was established for the Snohomish, Snoqualmie, and Skykomish peoples. Only one family remained, because they were too sick to leave. However, with the lack of food and water, and growing sickness on the Holmes Harbor reservation, the Stillaguamish had returned to their homelands by July, refusing to return to a reservation until the government negotiated a better deal.

The Stillaguamish continued their traditional lifestyle for at least 15 years after they refused to leave to a reservation, until the 1870s, when settlers began encroaching.

=== Federal recognition ===
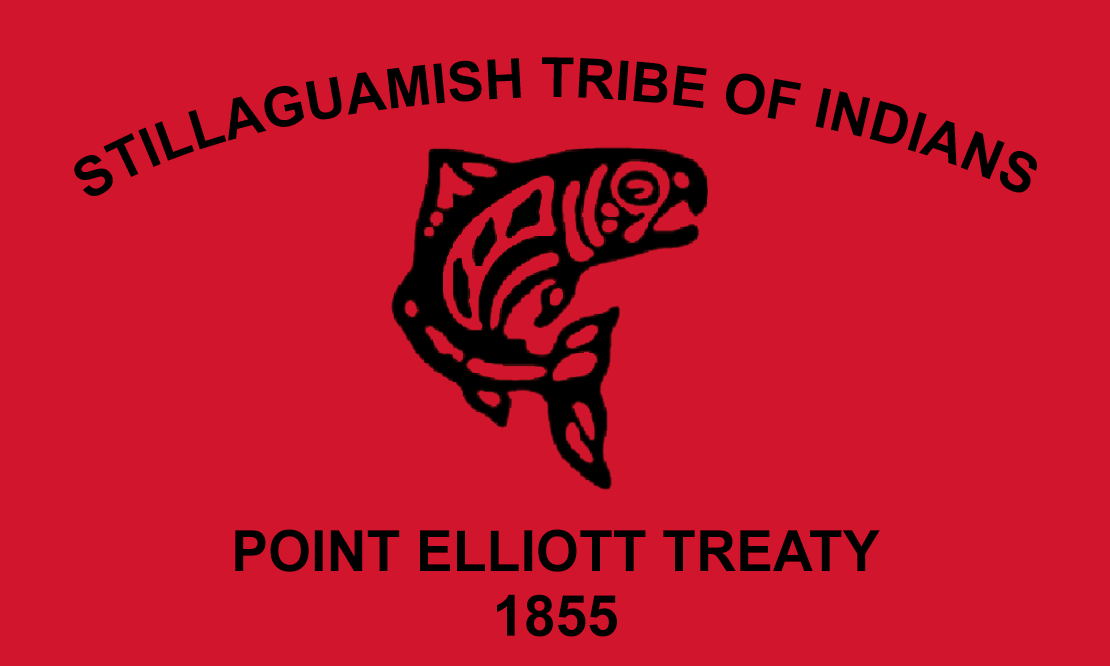
Flag of the Stillaguamish Tribe of Indians

The Stillaguamish Tribe of Washington ratified its constitution on January 31, 1953, establishing a democratically elected, six-member tribal council.

In 1974, the Stillaguamish Tribe petitioned for recognition from the United States' government. The Stillaguamish Tribe achieved federal recognition and treaty on October 27, 1976.

In 2003, the enrolled population of the Stillaguamish Tribe was 237. The Stillaguamish Tribe manages the salmon populations in the Stillaguamish River watershed with the help of Washington Department of Fish & Wildlife. As part of this effort, the Stillaguamish Tribe has a hatchery which releases Chinook and coho salmon, running educational activities about salmon.

In 2014, the Stillaguamish Tribe was granted a reservation specifically for the Stillaguamish. The 64-acre reservation was established near the Stillaguamish River, downriver from the former village at sq̓ʷuʔalqʷuʔ.

== Territory and land usage ==
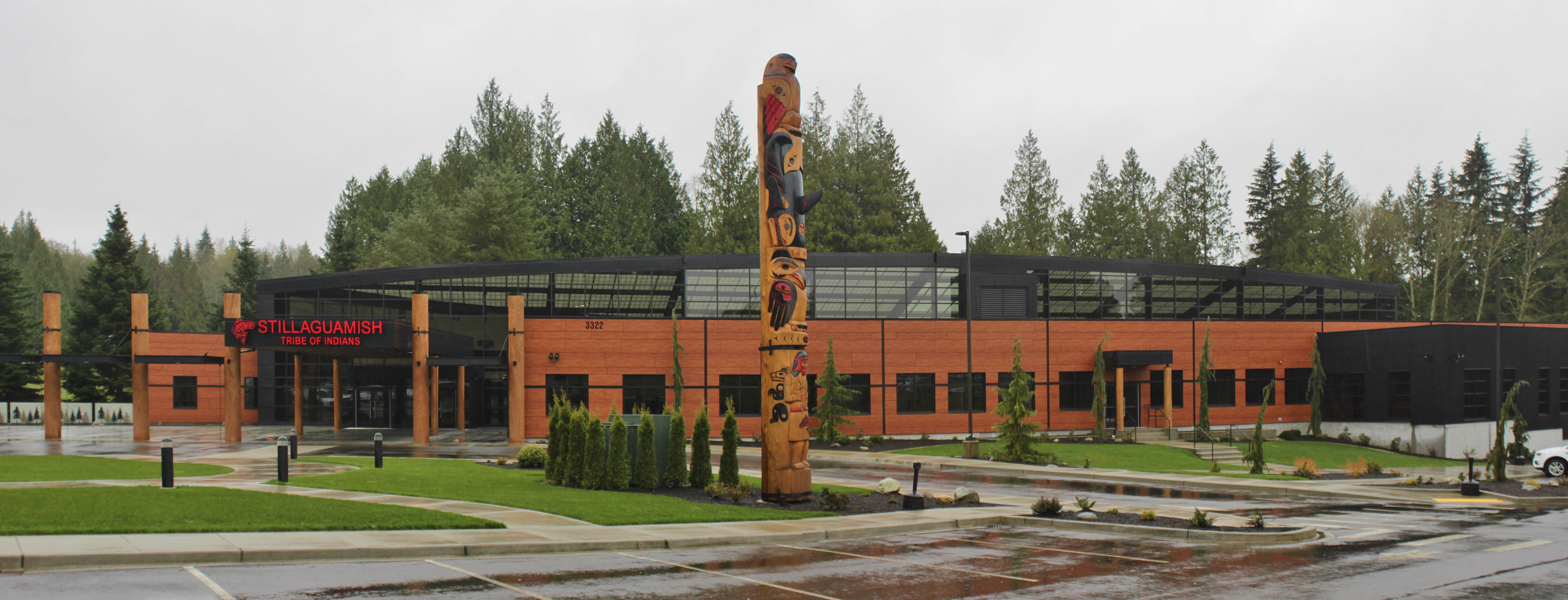
The Administration Building of the Stillaguamish Tribe

The traditional territory of the Stillaguamish extends along the drainage of the Stillaguamish River, including the North and South forks, and the main course. The Stillaguamish also utilized the coastline of Skagit Bay and Camano Island, along with members from other non-Stillaguamish villages.

Traditionally, there was limited private property ownership, and territorial rights were dominated by the idea of land use, extending to individuals based on the location of their village and usual and accustomed hunting and gathering areas.

Territorial rights also differed between the seasons. During the winter months, the exclusive rights to fishing stations along a river would be held by the local village. During the summer, the rights would be extended to those who were not from the village, but were tied in kinship to members of the village. Land rights were also granted to those who were not tied in kinship but had express permission to use hunting and gathering sites. These requests were often a formality, and were rarely denied.

The understanding of territory was constantly in flux, as kinship rights between individuals would repeatedly be redefined. Despite this, boundaries were well understood, especially around villages and certain important harvesting sites. Fishing stations and certain important gathering areas close to a village were closely controlled by their owners. However, the farther one traveled from a village, the less defined the boundaries became. Rural hunting and gathering areas were not tightly controlled and open to most, and many different groups would socialize and intermingle in those areas.

Territory sharing between tribes was common and reciprocal, and Stillaguamish people who shared their land with their neighbors would be sure to use their neighbors' land.

=== Villages ===
Like other Coast Salish cultures, the Stillaguamish were not migratory; they had permanent villages and structures which sometimes hundreds of people would live in. A village was made up of several winter longhouses, seasonal cattail mat houses, and various structures such as drying racks or fire pits. Longhouses were communally occupied by large groups of extended families.

Each village along the Stillaguamish River had fish traps of some sort in the nearby river, which were owned privately by a family.

Traditionally, Stillaguamish villages were autonomous, loosely bound together in culture, language, kinship, and geography. During times of crisis, war, or simply for large social activities, closely allied villages might band together, sometimes under the leadership of one or several powerful figures. However, this was only temporary and villages remained independent.

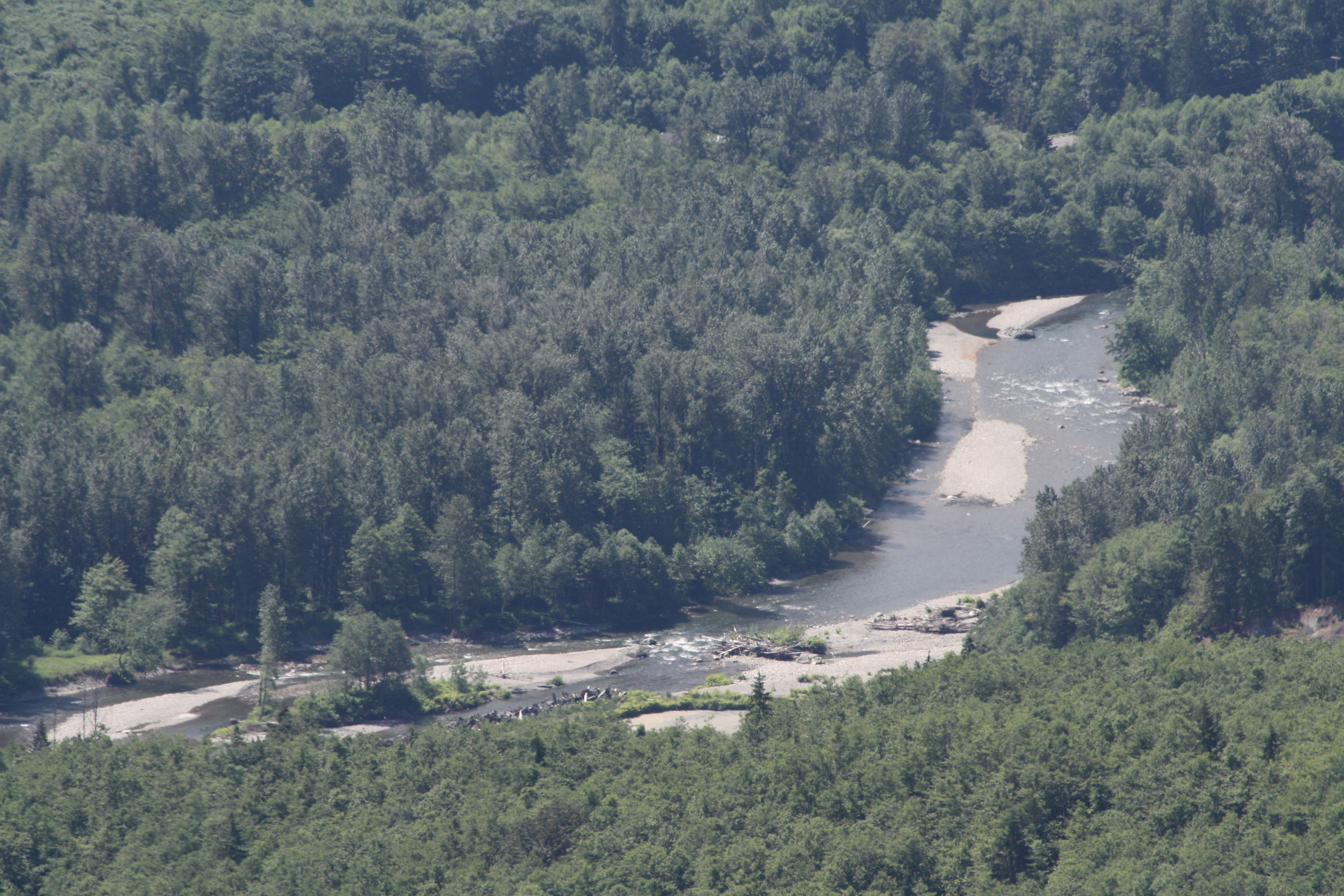
North Fork of the Stillaguamish River

List of Stillaguamish villages (Note: These population and housing statistics were originally taken around the mid-to-late 1800s, during the lifetime of Stillaguamish Chief James Dorsey.)
Name	Anglicization(s)	Location	Approximate population and number of longhouses
sdᶻəlgʷas	Sulgwas	Across river from the site of present city of Stanwood	3 houses, approximately 250 people
	Cubial	Northern tip of Florence Island, across from Church Creek	Approximately 400 people
	Loalko	Florence Island, 3/4 mile upriver from previous	1 house, approximately 5 families
	Seltach	North of Florence	3 houses, approximately 200 people
		Between Silvana and Florence	1 house, approximately 100 people
sq̓ʷuʔalqʷuʔ	Skabalko	Near the present city of Arlington, at the confluence of the North and South Forks	2 houses, approximately 200–300 people
kʷəbɬqʷuʔ	Klatsko	Near Arlington, along Jim Creek	
	Chuck-kol-che	Along the river at what is now Trafton	4 houses, approximately 200 people
		At or near what is now Hazel	2 houses, approximately 150–200 people
qʷacaʔkʷ	Quadsack, Quadsak	Along the banks of Hat Slough	2 houses, approximately about 100 people
dxʷtux̌ʷub	Splatum	At present site of Warm Beach	1 longhouse, several smaller cedar houses for visitors According to anthropologist Colin Tweddell, this was a Snohomish village

=== Summer camping grounds ===
During the summer, Stillaguamish people from villages along the whole river would traditionally use certain areas as base camps for summer activities like hunting and fishing. Some of these locations were built around villages, while others were purely seasonal campgrounds. The villages at dxʷtux̌ʷub and what is now Hazel had campgrounds for people visiting from all along the river, as well as for people visiting from other tribes. The village at dxʷtux̌ʷub had many small cabins which would be utilized by families visiting the lower Stillaguamish River.

Other locations, such as near what is now Oso, were general areas which anyone could use. The campgrounds at Oso were used as a launching spot for expeditions into the mountains and forests for hunting and berry picking. There were many of these such places between Pilchuck Creek and sq̓ʷuʔalqʷuʔ.

On sx̌ədəlwaʔs, known in English as Mount Higgins, there was possibly the most important of these sites. In the alpine meadows there was a large longhouse used seasonally, as well as many drying racks and a large fireplace. People from all over the Stillaguamish River valley would come to this camp in great numbers to hunt bear, deer, elk, and mountain goat, as well as gather many types of berries.

=== qʷacaʔkʷbixʷ ===
qʷacaʔkʷbixʷ, often anglicized as Quadsak or Quadsack, is the name which was given to those living along the lowest reaches of the Stillaguamish River. The name means "yellow people," from √qʷac meaning "yellow" and the suffixes =aʔkʷ=bixʷ meaning "people." The name refers to their unique practice of painting themselves yellow, rather than the traditional red.

Originally, the Quadsack were a separate group from (but very closely-tied with) the Stillaguamish proper. After the first Smallpox epidemic in the 18th century, the Quadsack population was decimated while the upriver Stillaguamish were slightly less affected, and thus, over the coming century, effectively became part of the Stillaguamish proper. Anthropologist Sally Snyder, expert witness for the Stillaguamish in their case before the Indian Claims Commission, testified that the Quadsack villages were mixed-use by the Stillaguamish and Quadsack after the epidemic. The village at dxʷtux̌ʷub was a mixed village of the Stillaguamish, Quadsack, and Snohomish. According to anthropologist Colin Tweddell, the Quadsack as a whole were a subgroup of the Snohomish.

== Culture and society ==
=== Language ===
The Stillaguamish traditionally speak a subdialect of Northern Lushootseed, called stuləgʷabšucid. In modern times, usage of the language has decreased to the point where there are no longer native speakers, and it is generally used in ceremonies. Despite this, there are still many second-language speakers and the Stillaguamish Tribe is engaging in revitalizing the language. The Stillaguamish Tribe has a YouTube channel where they post language-learning material.

=== Societal structure ===
The Stillaguamish traditionally had a class society with three classes: upper class (siʔiʔab), commoners, and slaves (stətudəq). The vast majority of people were upper class, with a small minority of commoners, made up of freed slaves, refugees, orphans, and others who were otherwise ostracized from society. The slave class was by far the smallest. Slaves were former prisoners of war, and war was relatively infrequent. Only the wealthiest and most prestigious owned slaves.

Society was traditionally dominated by the village and the family. There was no formal social organization higher the village until the colonial period, when extended villages and modern tribes arose as powerful leaders consolidated power. One would identify primarily with the village they were from, and beyond that, their family was most important.

=== Resources and sustenance ===
Both in ancient and modern times, cedar is one of the most important resources of the Stillaguamish. The bark, wood, and roots of cedar can all be used. Cedar wood is used for crafting house posts, canoes, houses, storage, and more. The bark is used for making rope, and weaving baskets, hats, clothing, and mats. The bark is also used in medicine, food, and some weaving of textiles.

The primary food resource for the Stillaguamish is salmon. Salmon were once plentiful in the rivers, and were caught at fishing stations, with traps, or with spears. Each village would have a fishing station, such as a weir or large fish trap, where salmon and other fish were caught for eating fresh, smoking, or drying. There were two large weirs on the Stillaguamish at the villages at what are now Florence and Trafton. Early settlers and visitors to the territory of the Stillaguamish thought their talent for fishing in even the most turbulent waters was remarkable. Even today, many Stillaguamish people largely rely on fishing salmon as a means of gathering food and for economic gain.

The Stillaguamish traditionally both hunted and domesticated animals. Animals were traditionally hunted primarily for food and clothing, as well as trading with other groups. The primary animals hunted were deer, elk, bear, and mountain goat. The area north of sq̓ʷuʔalqʷuʔ up to Pilchuck Creek and Lake Cavanaugh were prime places for getting deer. Stillaguamish people also traveled to areas used by other tribes, like the Snohomish, Skykomish, and Sauk, to hunt. The Stillaguamish were famed for their skills in hunting mountain goat up on Three Fingers Mountain (Lushootseed: gʷistalb) and Whitehorse Mountain (Lushootseed: čubaliali), and commonly invited other tribes to hunt with them in return for hunting privileges elsewhere.

The Stillaguamish domesticated the Salish Wool Dog, shaving them for their wool. They were kept separate from other animals in special areas, and highly cared for so as to maintain their coat. Both mountain goat wool and dog wool was used for weaving blankets and clothing, both of which were highly valuable in trading.

The Stillaguamish maintain a tradition of gathering plants in the forests, prairies, and alpine meadows in their territory. Traditionally, prairies were maintained and plants growing there were semi-domesticated. Slash-and-burn techniques were used to encourage new growth of plants and facilitate animal species. One of the most prolific prairies used by the Stillaguamish was at what is now Kent Prairie (Lushootseed: xʷbaqʷab), in Arlington. It was a plentiful source of many crops, such as camas, as well as various berries, grasses, and weeds and the only prairie within the core territory of the Stillaguamish. The Stillaguamish who were allied with the Sauk would also travel to Sauk Prairie to gather roots there. The Stillaguamish also gathered berries with their Snohomish allies at Kellogg Marsh, in what is now Marysville (Lushootseed: sɬəp̓qs).

Potatoes began being planted after their introduction. They were first planted at the village between Florence and Silvana, and soon after they had spread to many of the Stillaguamish villages where they were maintained around the village, and planted at prairies like at xʷbaqʷab.

=== Houses ===
The Stillaguamish traditionally had several types of housing. During the summer, temporary houses made of cattail mats or small, temporary longhouses were erected, while during the winter, the Stillaguamish lived in great cedar longhouses.

The winter lodgings of the Stillaguamish were large cedar plank longhouses, furnished from long cedar boards and rope made from cedar bark, with the interior walls covered with large woven cattail mats. On the inside, longhouses had large fire pits for heating and cooking in the center, and there were sleeping and storage platforms were built into the walls. Multiple families, generally part of the same extended family, would live together in different sections of the house. Each family in a house owned the roof planks which covered their section. Winter longhouses were built by professional carpenters, who masterfully crafted the planks with specialized tools. 40–50 men could build a longhouse in about 3–4 months.

The Stillaguamish also built large fortified longhouses called stronghouses, where trade goods and other valuables were kept. The village at Cubial had a 150-foot-long stronghouse that was fortified with spikes and traps along the entire perimeter.

=== Transportation ===
The traditional primary vessel of the Stillaguamish is the river canoe. As they live on the swift-flowing Stillaguamish, they were experts at navigating the currents. Canoes were poled upriver and would ride the current downriver. The North Fork, having many settlements up and down the whole river and always being full of canoes, was called a sort of highway between Skagit Bay and the Sauk River by early mountaineer Nels Bruseth. When traveling overland, canoes would be picked up and carried. There were several commonly used portages at Barlow Pass, Granite Falls, and near Darrington. Indian Pass between the Sauk and White Rivers was used for travel across the Cascades.

== Notable Stillaguamish ==
- James Dorsey (~1850–1935), Stillaguamish chief
