= Whitehorse Mountain (Washington) =

Mountain in Washington (state), United States

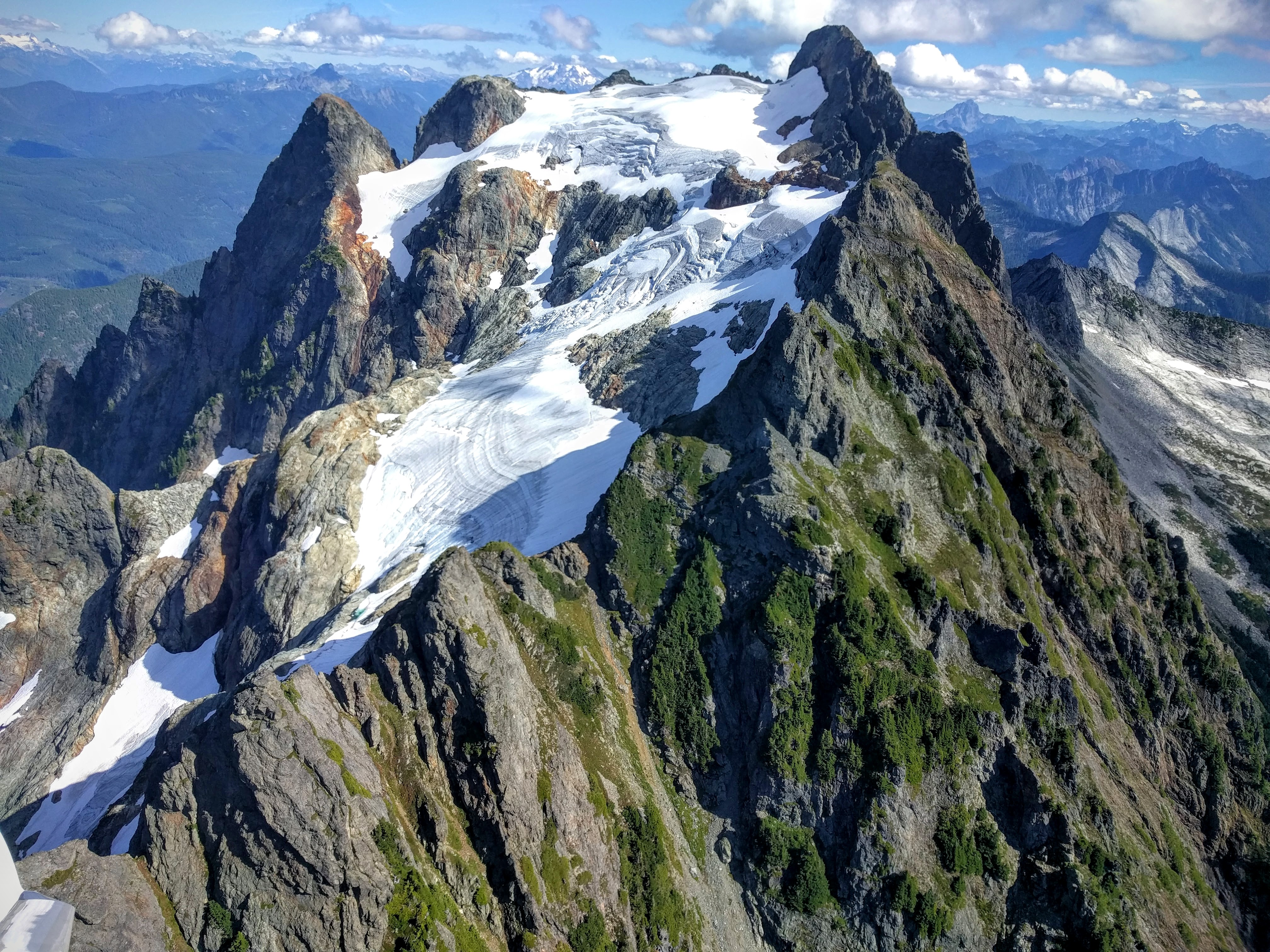
- Whitehorse Glacier and Mountain

Highest point
- Elevation: 6,840+ ft (2,080+ m) NGVD 29
- Prominence: 2,160 ft (660 m)
- Coordinates: 48°12′41″N 121°40′41″W

Naming
- Native name: čubaliali (Lushootseed)

Geography
- Location: Boulder River Wilderness, Snohomish County, Washington, U.S.
- Parent range: North Cascades
- Topo map: USGS Whitehorse Mountain

Climbing
- First ascent: 1909 by Nels Bruseth
- Easiest route: Northwest Shoulder (hike/snow climb/scramble)

Whitehorse Mountain (Lushootseed: čubaliali) is a peak near the western edge of the North Cascades in Washington state. It is located just southwest of the Sauk River Valley town of Darrington, near the northern boundary of Boulder River Wilderness in Mount Baker-Snoqualmie National Forest. While not of particularly high absolute elevation, even for the North Cascades, it is notable for its large, steep local relief. For example, its north face rises 6,000 feet (1,830 m) in only 1.8 mi (2.9 km).

The first recorded climb of Whitehorse Mountain was made in 1909 by Nels Bruseth. The standard route on the peak is via the Northwest Shoulder, which begins with a difficult trail hike, involves a good deal of snow climbing, and culminates with some exposed scrambling, class 3. The net elevation gain is about 6,000 feet (1,828.80 m), making this a strenuous outing. Other routes include the Whitehorse Glacier on the north side of the peak, the East Ridge, and the Southeast Ridge.

The mountain is known as čubaliali in the Lushootseed language used by local Lushotseed-speaking peoples. In Stillaguamish and Sauk mythology, čubaliali was once a woman who came over the mountains. She found a husband, but another woman, sx̌ədəlwaʔs (Mount Higgins), who came from the Sound, envied the husband of čubaliali. sx̌ədəlwaʔs and čubaliali fought over the man, and in the battle, čubaliali clawed at sx̌ədəlwaʔs, leaving deep gashes in her face.

The English name was given to the mountain by Darrington postmaster W. C. Hiles in 1894, who noted that a snowpatch on the mountain resembled a white horse owned by pioneer Fred Olds that the townspeople were searching for.

Whitehorse Mountain appears in the movie War Games starring Matthew Broderick. In the scene Matthew Broderick's character is seen using a pay phone at a gas station with Whitehorse Mountain in the background.
