= Swede Heaven, Washington =

- CDP
- Location of Swede Heaven, Washington.
- Coordinates: 48°16′50″N 121°42′35″W
- Country: United States
- State: Washington
- County: Snohomish

Area
  - Total: 7.02 sq mi (18.17 km^{2})
  - Land: 7.01 sq mi (18.15 km^{2})
  - Water: 0.0077 sq mi (0.02 km^{2})
- Elevation: 413 ft (126 m)

Population (2010)
  - Total: 768
  - Density: 110/sq mi (42.3/km^{2})
- Time zone: UTC-8 (Pacific (PST))
  - Summer (DST): UTC-7 (PDT)
- GNIS feature ID: 1526850

Swede Heaven is a census-designated place (CDP) in Snohomish County, Washington, United States. As of the 2020 census, Swede Heaven had a population of 839.

The community was named for its population of Swedish immigrants and has also been called "Swede Haven" in various sources. It is bisected by State Route 530 and the Whitehorse Trail, a multi-use rail trail.

== Geography ==
According to the United States Census Bureau, the CDP has a total area of 7.014 square miles (18.17 km^{2}), of which 7.007 square miles (18.15 km^{2}) is land and 0.007 square miles (0.02 km^{2}) (0.10%) is water.

== Demographics ==
Historical population
Census	Pop.	Note	%±
2010	768		—
2020	839		9.2%
U.S. Decennial Census; 2000 2010

Swede Heaven first appeared as a census designated place in the 2010 U.S. census.

=== Racial and ethnic composition ===
Swede Heaven CDP, Washington – Racial and ethnic composition Note: the US Census treats Hispanic/Latino as an ethnic category. This table excludes Latinos from the racial categories and assigns them to a separate category. Hispanics/Latinos may be of any race.
Race / Ethnicity (NH = Non-Hispanic)	Pop 2010	Pop 2020	% 2010	% 2020
White alone (NH)	706	726	91.93%	86.53%
Black or African American alone (NH)	1	1	0.13%	0.12%
Native American or Alaska Native alone (NH)	18	11	2.34%	1.31%
Asian alone (NH)	5	12	0.65%	1.43%
Native Hawaiian or Pacific Islander alone (NH)	1	1	0.13%	0.12%
Other race alone (NH)	1	12	0.13%	1.43%
Mixed race or Multiracial (NH)	21	44	2.73%	5.24%
Hispanic or Latino (any race)	15	32	1.95%	3.81%
Total	768	839	100.00%	100.00%

== Education ==
The community is served by the Darrington School District.
