= Summer Meltdown =

Camping and musical festival

- Genre: Jam
- Dates: August
- Locations: Darrington, Washington; Monroe, Washington
- Years active: 2000–2019, 2022
- Founders: Josh Clauson
- Website: Summer Meltdown website

Summer Meltdown is an annual camping and music festival in the Pacific Northwest region of the United States. It was originally based in Darrington, Washington, and relocated to Monroe, Washington, in 2022. The festival is held each August and features over 50 bands on four stages over four days, the Green Village showcasing environmental and social outreach, food, craft and retail vendors, a Kids' Area, Kids' Parade, and the Little Seahorse Music Academy.

== History ==
The Summer Meltdown was founded by Pacific Northwest band Flowmotion in 2000, as a community-based music festival on San Juan Island, with coordination and execution handled by members of Flowmotion and friends of the band. Flowmotion performed as the headliner of the festival.

In 2002, Lewis Anderson and Andrea Wood became key members of the coordination efforts, which included development of an official volunteer program, ticketing system, logistical planning, and county petitioning and permitting attempts. In consecutive years, they each took on more responsibilities, securing insurance, setting up vending program, providing web copy and coordinating media efforts, and handling site logistics. Flowmotion continued to perform as the headliner of the festival until 2011.

By 2005, the Summer Meltdown had reached a critical growth stage and it was no longer possible to throw the event as a party, without official county permitting. The event had long since moved off San Juan Island and had occurred in three venues in three counties. Event coordinators agreed to take a hiatus that year and look to a future re-grouping in 2006.

In 2006 the festival moved to the Whitehorse Mountain Amphitheater in Darrington, Washington, which it shared with the Darrington Bluegrass Festival. The festival property is also known as the Darrington Bluegrass Park. Because of the diverse musical variety at Summer Meltdown, the festival producers decided to create a venue name that did not include bluegrass in the name, hence the name, Whitehorse Mountain Amphitheater.

No concerts were held in 2020 due to the COVID-19 pandemic. Summer Meltdown returned in 2022 after relocating to Monroe, Washington, but the following edition was cancelled.

== See also ==
- List of jam band music festivals
