= Nels Bruseth =

American mountaineer and author from Washington state (1886–1957)

Nels Bruseth (August 1, 1886 – March 24, 1957) was an American mountaineer, naturalist, author, and painter. He was a forest ranger employed by the United States Forest Service from 1916 to 1951 at a ranger station in Darrington, Washington, where he was a civic booster.

== Biography ==
Bruseth was born on August 1, 1886, to Norwegian immigrants who moved from Michigan to Stanwood, Washington. He had two brothers and two sisters. Bruseth attended schools in Silvana and took over his father's farm after his death in 1905, but sold it in 1913 and spent the following two years in California. Bruseth returned to Washington in 1916, taking a position with the United States Forest Service at their Darrington station, where he would be employed for 35 years.

He served as the fire lookout at Mount Pugh and settled on a 10-acre (4.0 ha) homestead in the Darrington area. Bruseth made the first recorded ascent of Whitehorse Mountain in 1909 and Mount Pugh in 1916. According to local legend, Bruseth courted Beate Staff Falk, a recent Norwegian immigrant to the area, by making the descent from Mount Pugh once a week to take her to the town's dance hall. The two were married on May 10, 1921, and had two children.

As a forest ranger, Bruseth developed mountain trails in the North Cascades and was active in civic affairs for the Darrington community. He volunteered as the head of several local improvement committees, including those organizing the Timber Bowl festival and other events, and taught children to ski. Bruseth was also a noted local historian, photographer, botanist, guitarist, geologist, and author. He wrote a weekly column in The Arlington Times and published several books, including a compilation of indigenous legends from the Stillaguamish and Sauk-Suiattle.

For his contributions to Darrington, local residents honored Bruseth as "Mr. Darrington" in 1950, following an attempt to make him the newly-incorporated town's first mayor, which he turned down as a federal employee who was ineligible to hold a civic office. Bruseth retired in 1951 and spent much of his retirement painting local landscapes, which were donated to causes in Darrington. He died on March 24, 1957, at a hospital in Arlington, one year after a heart attack.

Bruseth's life story was told in the play Common Wealth, which adapted the history of Darrington and performed by local residents. Nels Bruseth Memorial Garden in Darrington is named in his honor.

== Works ==
- Bruseth, Nels (1926). Indian Stories and Legends of the Stillaguamish, Sauks and Allied Tribes. Arlington Times Press.
