= Washington State Route 530 =

State highway in western Washington, US

State Route 530
- Oso Slide Memorial Highway
- SR 530 highlighted in red

Route information
- Auxiliary route of I-5
- Maintained by WSDOT
- Length: 50.45 mi (81.19 km)
- Existed: 1964–present

Major junctions
- West end: I-5 in Arlington
- SR 9 in Arlington
- East end: SR 20 in Rockport

Location
- Country: United States
- State: Washington
- Counties: Snohomish, Skagit

Highway system
- State highways in Washington; Interstate; US; State; Scenic; Pre-1964; 1964 renumbering; Former
← SR 529	→ SR 531

State Route 530 (SR 530) is a state highway in western Washington, United States. It serves Snohomish and Skagit counties, traveling 50.52 miles (81.30 km) from an interchange with Interstate 5 (I-5) southwest of Arlington past SR 9 in Arlington and Darrington to end at SR 20 in Rockport. Serving the communities of Arlington, Arlington Heights, Oso, Darrington and Rockport, the roadway travels parallel to a fork of the Stillaguamish River from Arlington to Darrington, the Sauk River from Darrington to Rockport and the Whitehorse Trail from Arlington to Darrington.

The first segment of SR 530 to appear on a map was a road extending from Arlington to Oso in 1899. The first segment to be state-maintained was Secondary State Highway 1E (SSH 1E), which ran from Conway to Arlington. SSH 1E was extended to Darrington in 1957 and later renumbered to SR 530 in 1964; the road was extended to Rockport in 1983 and later the route from Conway to I-5 was removed from the system in 1991. A section of the highway was destroyed in the 2014 Oso landslide and was rebuilt; a longer portion of SR 530 was designated the Oso Slide Memorial Highway in 2019.

== Route description ==
SR 530 begins at a diamond interchange with I-5 at Island Crossing in Arlington, near the freeway's bridge over the Stillaguamish River. The road continues west from the interchange as the Pioneer Highway towards Stanwood and travels east as SR 530 through the Island Crossing commercial area. The highway leaves Arlington city limits after intersecting Smokey Point Boulevard and crosses a predominantly rural area along the banks of Stillaguamish River. SR 530 turns north and east on the approach to downtown Arlington, crossing over March Creek and intersecting SR 9 at the west end of Division Street. The two state highways travel north concurrently for one block to Burke Avenue, which SR 530 uses to travel east through downtown Arlington and cross over the Centennial Trail.

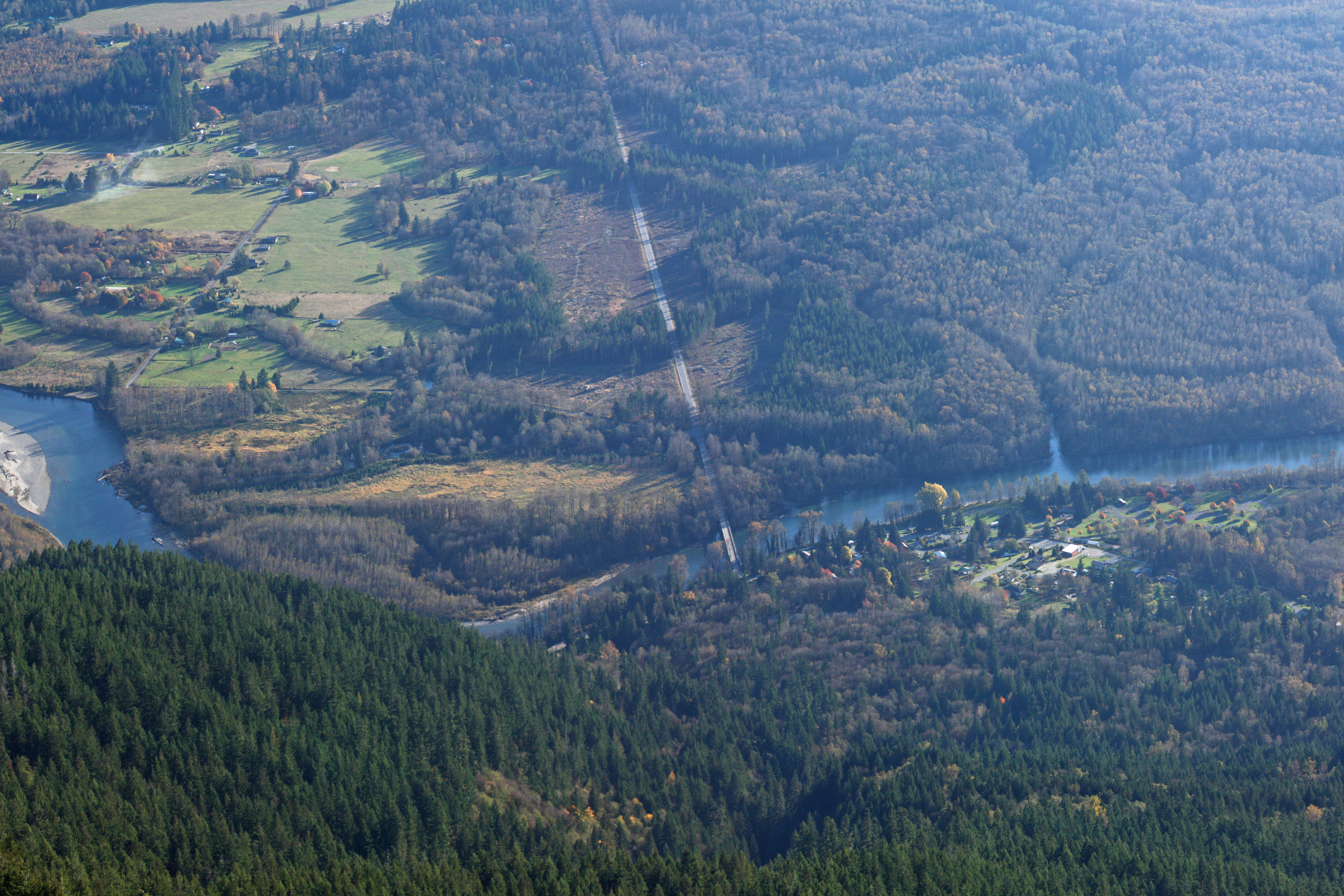
Rockport (bottom right), on the Skagit River, lies at the end of SR 530 (center)

After leaving downtown Arlington, the highway crosses over the South Fork Stillaguamish River and travels along the river bank near Twin Rivers Park. SR 530 continues northeast and follows the North Fork Stillaguamish River into the rural Arlington Heights area, ascending into the foothills of the Cascade Mountains. The highway passes through Trafton, where it intersects a road that leads to the U.S. Navy's Jim Creek Naval Radio Station, and continues northeast around Ebey Hill. It is joined by the Whitehorse Trail, an unpaved hiking and equestrian trail that is being developed by the county government along a former railroad grade. SR 530 then crosses the North Fork Stillaguamish River on a steel tied-arch bridge and turns east, following an arm of Frailey Mountain that runs parallel to the Skagit–Snohomish county border.

SR 530 travels east past a rock quarry and several farms on the outskirts of Oso, which consists of several homes on the east side of Deer Creek and north of the Rhodes River Ranch. The highway crosses over the river again and travels along the south bank through the narrowed valley. It passes a memorial at the site of the 2014 Oso mudslide, which destroyed a small residential subdivision. The highway continues due east through Hazel and White Horse before it passes the venue of the Darrington Rodeo and Bluegrass festival. SR 530 then veers southeast and enters the town of Darrington, passing the municipal airport and traveling through downtown on Seeman Street. The highway turns north onto Emmens Street at a junction with the Mountain Loop Highway, which continues south to Granite Falls, and continues through a lumberyard before leaving Darrington. SR 530 then travels northeast along the west side of the Sauk River and enters Skagit County after skirting the boundary of the Mount Baker National Forest. The highway travels through the Sauk-Suiattle Indian Reservation, home to a small casino and smoke shop, before turning east to cross over the river on a steel truss bridge. SR 530 continues north along the river through the forested Sauk Valley and crosses over the Skagit River into Rockport. The highway turns northeast and terminates at an intersection with SR 20, which continues west to Burlington and east into North Cascades National Park.

SR 530 is maintained by the Washington State Department of Transportation (WSDOT). The section between I-5 at Island Crossing and SR 9 in downtown Arlington is designated as a Highway of Statewide Significance by the state legislature and as a minor route of the National Highway System by the federal government. WSDOT conducts an annual survey of average traffic volume on the state highway system that is measured in terms of annual average daily traffic. Daily traffic volumes on SR 530 in 2016 range from a minimum of 1,100 vehicles near its eastern terminus in Rockport to a maximum of 19,000 vehicles near I-5 at Island Crossing.

== History ==
Additions and removals to SR 530:
'"`UNIQ--templatestyles-00000052-QINU`"' Pioneer Highway (removed in 1991)
'"`UNIQ--templatestyles-00000053-QINU`"' Unchanged section of SR 530
'"`UNIQ--templatestyles-00000054-QINU`"' Rockport addition (1983)

The Stillaguamish and Sauk rivers were traditionally used by the Sauk-Suiattle peoples, who traversed them in boats and also used parallel overland trails. A rough wagon road was plowed along the river bank by 1889, connecting Arlington to new settlements in the Stillaguamish valley. The wagon road also continued north along the Sauk River to Rockport. The wagon road was improved in 1901 alongside the construction of a new Arlington–Darrington railroad by the Northern Pacific Railway to support logging in the area. The road originally terminated in Oso, but was extended as a one-lane highway that was constructed from 1910 to 1912.

The current route of SR 530 first appeared on a map around 1899, when a road following the North Fork of the Stillaguamish River ended east of Oso. A map published in 1911 showed a road traveling from Conway southeast past Stanwood and Arlington towards Oso and Darrington. The first state-maintained highway that used a section of the current roadway was Secondary State Highway 1E (SSH 1E), which was established in 1937 during the creation of the Primary and secondary highways; SSH 1E ran from an intersection with Primary State Highway 1 (PSH 1) in Conway south to what would become SSH 1Y in 1945 in Stanwood (then called East Stanwood) and east past PSH 1 again to SSH 1A in Arlington. SSH 1E was later extended in 1957 past SSH 1A in Arlington to the Mountain Loop Highway in Darrington, which had been finished by late 1941. The original county road between Arlington and Darrington, paved in 1916, generally ran on the north side of the river, but the new highway was shifted to the south bank.

During the 1964 highway renumbering, SSH 1E became SR 530, SSH 1A became SR 9 and SSH 1Y became SR 532; from 1964 until 1983, SR 530 was 49.07 miles (78.97 km) long. The highway's interchange with Interstate 5 west of Arlington was opened to traffic on September 28, 1965. On December 26, 1980, SR 530 was closed between Stanwood and Silvana due to a flood that caused the Stillaguamish River to overflow from its banks, which the highway parallels. The roadway was extended 18.64 miles (30.00 km) north from Darrington to SR 20 in Rockport, making the highway a total of 68.34 miles (109.98 km) and both termini being in Skagit County. SR 530 was later shortened 16.98 miles (27.33 km), moving the western terminus to an interchange with I-5 southwest of Arlington.

Since being shortened, five minor construction projects, arranged by the Washington State Department of Transportation (WSDOT), have occurred. The confluence of the Sauk and Suiattle rivers have eroded the riverbank that supports the road north of Darrington. Wilder Construction Inc. of Bellingham was hired by WSDOT to stabilize the riverbank to prevent the highway collapsing into the river. The project was completed in December 2007 and took place between Darrington and Rockport. A temporary rock wall was also constructed to protect SR 530 and will be removed once WSDOT realigns the highway north of Darrington, which is expected to be completed after 2011.

On March 22, 2014, a three-mile section of SR 530 in northern Snohomish County, roughly midway between Darrington and Arlington, was completely blocked by the Oso landslide. The highway was cleared enough by May 31 to open one lane of escorted traffic and by June 20 to two-lane traffic. Temporary access had been restored within a month of the mudslide using a utilities road guided by pilot cars. A longer detour via State Route 20 was supplemented by the early reopening of the Mountain Loop Highway to provide limited access to Darrington. Because the highway was badly damaged, and because the topography of the area had been altered by the landslide, WSDOT decided to elevate that section of the highway when it was rebuilt. The new roadway was opened September 22, 2014. A minor landslide in April 2017 forced the highway to close for five days while a hill was monitored for potential movement.

In 2018, the community proposed naming a section of SR 530 the "Oso Memorial Highway" to commemorate the disaster. The "Oso Slide Memorial Highway" designation from Arlington to Oso was approved by the state transportation commission in February 2019.

The Arlington city government plans to construct a roundabout on SR 530 at Smokey Point Boulevard in the Island Crossing area due to increased traffic volumes. A temporary traffic signal was installed at the intersection in 2020.

=== Former route (1964–1991) ===
From 1964 until 1991, SR 530 began at an interchange with I-5 in Conway and traveled southeast to I-5 again at the current western terminus and then followed the current route. The former routing, now called the Pioneer Highway, followed the Seattle–Vancouver, BC route of the Great Northern Railway served by the International from Conway to Silvana. The former route began at a diamond interchange with I-5 in Conway, which was also the western terminus of SR 534. From the interchange, the roadway traveled west to Fir Island Road, which travels west across the South Fork of the Skagit River to Fir Island. The road then turned south to parallel railroad tracks owned by the Great Northern Railway and also parallel the South Fork of the Skagit River. At Milltown, SR 530 intersected Milltown Road, which would later interchange with I-5 to the east. South of Milltown and west of Lake Ketchum, the route crossed into Snohomish County. After crossing into Snohomish County and passing Lake Ketchum, SR 530 traveled south to a junction with the Old Pacific Highway and turned southeast into North Stanwood. The highway exited North Stanwood to enter Stanwood, where it intersected SR 532. The roadway curved southeast and passed Sunday Lake, some residential areas and Norman before entering Silvana. After Silvana, the road continued southeast and later eastward to interchange with I-5.

== Major intersections ==
County	Location	mi	km	Destinations	Notes
Snohomish	Arlington	0.00	0.00	I-5 / Pioneer Highway – Seattle, Vancouver B.C.	Interchange; continues as Pioneer Highway (former SR 530)
Snohomish	Arlington	0.37– 0.52	0.60– 0.84	Smokey Point Boulevard – Smokey Point	Former US 99
Snohomish	Arlington	3.84	6.18	SR 9 south / Division Street – Snohomish	Western end of SR 9 overlap
Snohomish	Arlington	3.95	6.36	SR 9 north – Sedro-Woolley	Eastern end of SR 9 overlap
Snohomish	Oso	20.09	32.33	Oso Mudslide Memorial	
Snohomish	Darrington	31.88	51.31	Mountain Loop Highway – Granite Falls	
Skagit	Rockport	50.45	81.19	SR 20 (North Cascades Highway) – Burlington, Okanogan	Eastern terminus
1.000 mi = 1.609 km; 1.000 km = 0.621 mi: Concurrency terminus
