= Darrington, Washington =

Darrington
- Town
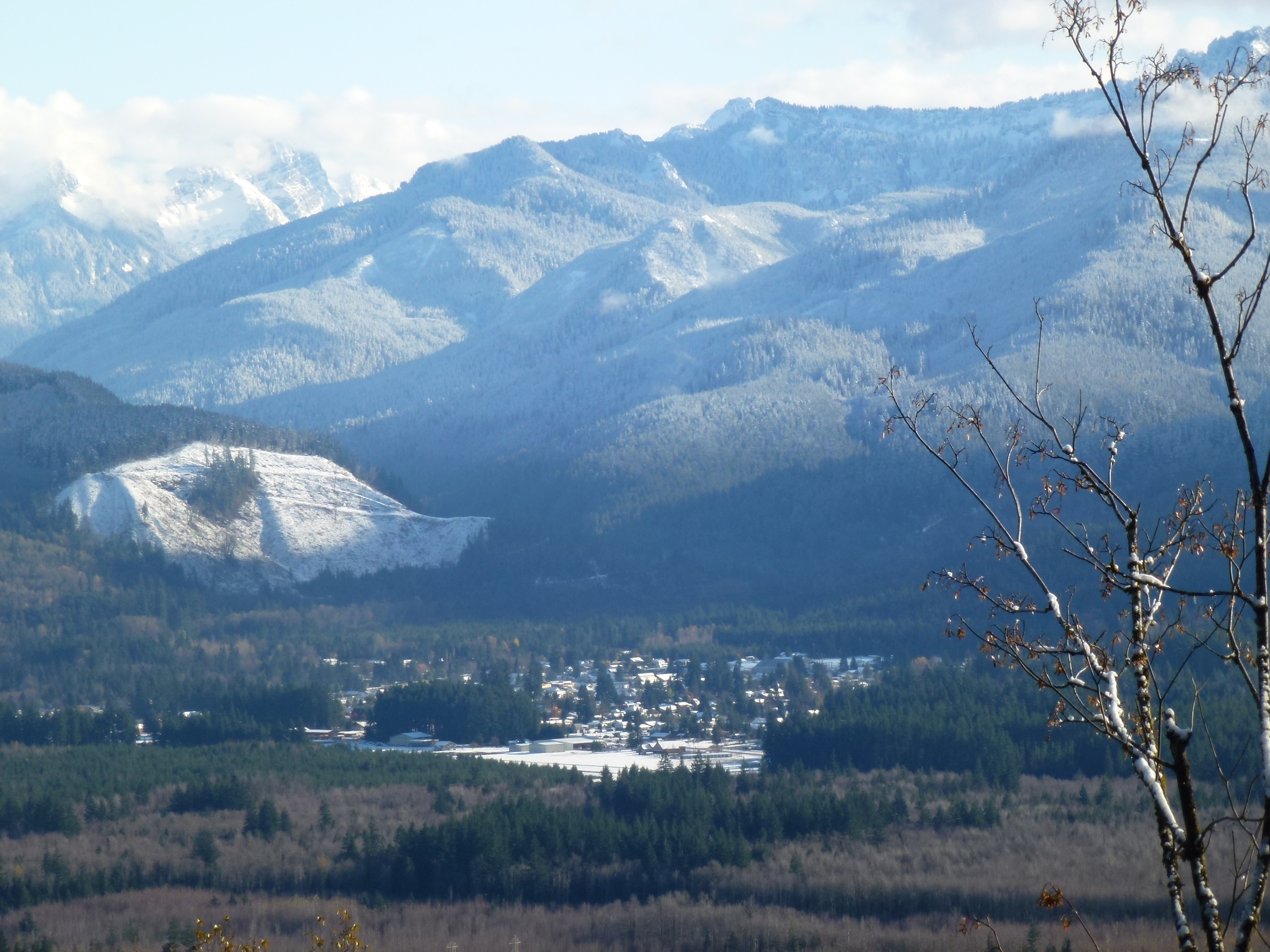
- Distant view of Darrington from the northwest
- Interactive map of Darrington
- Coordinates: 48°15′08″N 121°36′11″W
- Country: United States
- State: Washington
- County: Snohomish
- Founded: 1891
- Incorporated: October 15, 1945

Government
  - Type: Mayor–council
  - Mayor: Dan Rankin

Area
  - Total: 1.75 sq mi (4.54 km^{2})
  - Land: 1.73 sq mi (4.47 km^{2})
  - Water: 0.027 sq mi (0.07 km^{2})
- Elevation: 558 ft (170 m)

Population (2020)
  - Total: 1,462
  - Estimate (2022): 1,461
  - Density: 834.1/sq mi (322.03/km^{2})
- Time zone: UTC-8 (Pacific (PST))
  - Summer (DST): UTC-7 (PDT)
- ZIP Code: 98241
- Area code: 360, 564
- FIPS code: 53-16690
- GNIS feature ID: 2412405
- Website: townofdarrington.com

Darrington is a town in Snohomish County, Washington, United States. It is located in a North Cascades mountain valley formed by the Sauk and North Fork Stillaguamish rivers. Darrington is connected to nearby areas by State Route 530, which runs along the two rivers towards the city of Arlington, located 30 miles (48 km) to the west, and Rockport. It had a population of 1,462 at the 2020 census.

Non-indigenous settlement in the area began in 1891 at the site of a Skagit campsite between the two rivers, near the traditional home of the Sauk-Suiattle tribe. Prospectors had arrived in the area during the 1880s while looking for gold and other minerals, but were quickly displaced by the logging industry that would come to dominate Darrington for much of the 20th century. The Northern Pacific Railway built a branch line to the town in 1901 and ushered in several years of growth.

During the Great Depression, Darrington hosted a Civilian Conservation Corps camp that improved roads, trails, and firefighting infrastructure in the nearby Mount Baker National Forest. Several waves of Appalachian emigrants arrived in the area from North Carolina, forming a culture that is seen in the town's annual bluegrass festival and rodeo.

Darrington was incorporated as a town in 1945, under a mayor–council government. Its economy has transitioned away from logging and towards tourism, particularly outdoor activities such as hiking, mountain climbing, and fishing, due to its proximity to the Mount Baker–Snoqualmie National Forest. The Darrington area is 554 feet (169 m) above sea level and receives significantly more precipitation and snowfall than the Puget Sound lowlands.

== History ==
=== Prehistory and early exploration ===
The upper Stillaguamish and Sauk valleys on the Sauk, Suiattle, and White Chuck rivers were historically inhabited by various Native American Coast Salish groups, including the Stillaguamish, the Sauk-Suiattle, and the Upper Skagit. The Sauk-Suiattle maintained a village site and burial ground near modern-day Darrington, while the Skagit used the plain between the Stillaguamish and Sauk rivers as a portage for overland transport of canoes. The portage, Anglicized as Kudsl Kudsl or Kuds-al-kaid, was also used as a transiting point for travelers from Eastern Washington on their way to and from the Puget Sound coast.

The area was known as Burn or Sauk Portage to early surveyors and visitors from towns along the Puget Sound coastline. A group of railroad surveyors for the Northern Pacific Railway arrived in modern-day Darrington in 1870 while plotting the potential route for a railroad crossing the Cascades to Lake Chelan, but ultimately chose Stampede Pass to the south. The North Stillaguamish Valley was nicknamed "Starve Out" by early settlers, who arrived alone and underprepared for the area's conditions, leading to several difficult winters. Soldiers sent to the area by the valley settlers threatened to evict the Sauk-Suiattles; this did not occur as the settlers' claim that the Sauk-Suiattle were hostile and had attacked them was determined to be unfounded. The tribe later hired surveyors to record their claims to the eastern side of the Sauk River, lands that currently comprise their Indian reservation.

The discovery of gold and other valuable minerals in the Monte Cristo area in 1889 lured prospectors into the North Cascades and stimulated the development of the surrounding valleys. A 45-mile (72 km) wagon road along the Sauk River connecting Monte Cristo to Sauk Prairie and the settlement of Sauk City on the Skagit River was built in 1891, later forming part of the modern Mountain Loop Highway. It was only used for three years before being replaced by the Everett and Monte Cristo Railway to the south; until that time, the Sauk Prairie at the modern site of Darrington was an overnight camping spot for prospectors. Nearby areas were explored by prospectors who made over a hundred claims to tracts of land in the highlands around the valley, including Gold Hill.

=== Establishment and early development ===
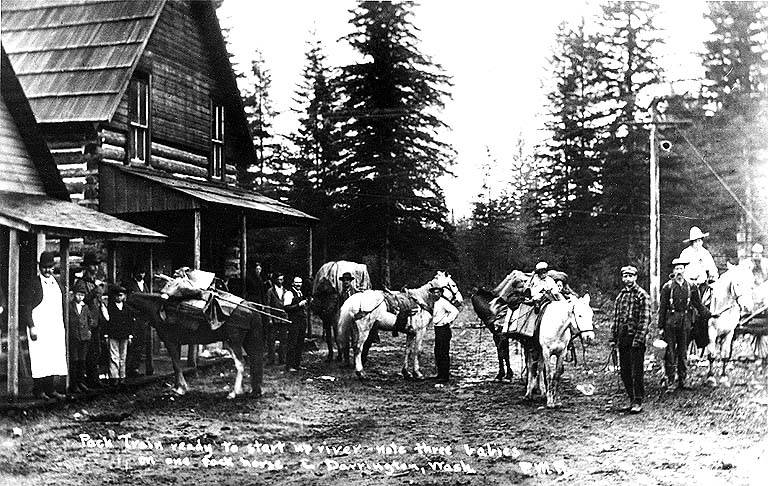
A group of packhorses pictured outside a general store in Darrington, c. 1905

The Sauk Prairie campsite evolved into a settlement that was known as "The Portage" and developed around several homesteads established between 1888 and 1891. A vote on a name was held by several pioneer residents in July 1891 in advance of the establishment of a post office. The vote was tied between two options, Portage (in some accounts, Norma) and Darrington, the maiden name of settler W. W. Cristopher's mother. According to some reports, the name was originally to be "Barrington" but was changed due to a mistake from the Postal Department or by the townspeople to resemble the word "dare". By the end of the decade, the town had gained a schoolhouse, a general store, a hotel, and a postmaster, Fred Olds, whose horse inspired the naming of Whitehorse Mountain.

Darrington's residents lobbied the Seattle and International Railway for the construction of a branch line from Arlington to the town as early as 1895, offering a 15-year contract to ship 75 percent of the area's extracted ores. The railroad agreed to the offer and began construction in 1900. It later merged with the Northern Pacific Railway, outpacing Great Northern and their plans to build a railroad to their timber holdings in the Sauk River valley. Railway crews arrived in the Darrington area by the following year and the first train arrived at the town's depot in 1901.

Several sawmills and other timber industries began in the years following the railroad's completion, as mining fortunes in the surrounding area dwindled. Most of the original prospectors had left the Darrington area during the Klondike gold rush of the late 1890s, while those who remained established a single smelter in the mountains. A Bornite mine was later developed at Long Mountain in hopes of reviving mining in the area, but was abandoned after its mineral deposits were found to be smaller than expected. By 1906, Darrington had more than a hundred residents; a second hotel and the town's first social club had been built. The U.S. Lumber Company, which began in 1901 as the Allen Mill, was the largest employer in Darrington during the early 1910s, producing 23,000 board feet (54.28 m^{3}) of wood per day.

U.S. Lumber angered the townspeople by hiring 21 Japanese laborers at similar wages to their white counterparts. In June 1910, a mob of white men rioted and drove the Japanese out of town after little resistance, paying for their train fare to Everett after allowing them to retrieve their belongings. A report by Seattle-based vice-consul Kinjiro Hayashi was forwarded to the Japanese ambassador and state government. The company filed for an injunction after rioters had threatened to burn its Darrington mill and other properties should it attempt to return the Japanese laborers. The injunction was denied, but the townspeople relented and allowed 20 Japanese laborers to return to the mill a week later following Prince Fushimi Hiroyasu's visit to Seattle.

=== Early 20th century ===
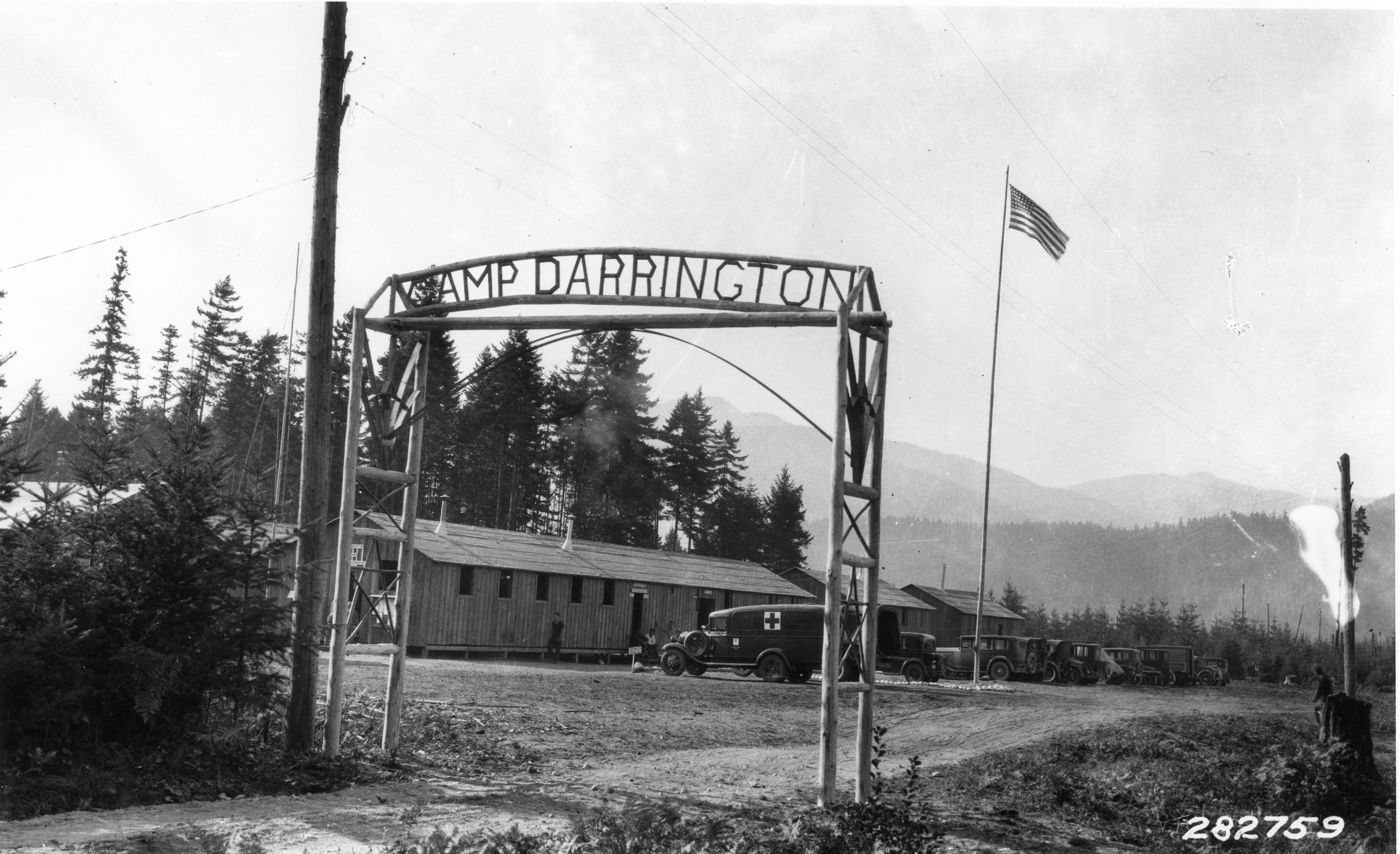
The entrance to Camp Darrington, established in 1933 by the Civilian Conservation Corps

Darrington's residents resisted the county government's dry plan to prohibit the sale of alcohol and close the town's saloons. They circulated a petition to incorporate Darrington as a fourth-class city in order to continue alcohol sales, but the attempt was thwarted after protests by U.S. Lumber and several civic leaders. On July 5, 1910, the town voted 46–35 in favor of remaining a "wet" settlement, but the countywide plebiscite the same day passed in favor of prohibition.

The town grew substantially in the early 1920s, with new sawmills attracting more residents and businesses. The wagon road along the North Fork Stillaguamish River (now part of State Route 530) was improved. A local improvement club established a fire department, a municipal water supply, and electrical service. Standard Oil built an auxiliary gas station in 1922 to serve the area, and a stagecoach service started at the same time. Darrington gained its first movie theater in 1923, a high school in 1925, and a purpose-built jail that replaced a disused boxcar.

Falling lumber prices during the Great Depression led several small sawmills in the Darrington area to suspend operations for a full year and laying off most of the town's workforce in late 1930. The town suffered outbreaks of scarlet fever and smallpox in 1931, followed by winter storms that damaged bridges and roads in the Sauk valley. The Civilian Conservation Corps (CCC) work program established Camp Darrington on May 20, 1933, to provide employment for up to 200 men from northern Snohomish County. The townspeople established a local cooperative association in 1935 to create jobs, including 33 at an independent sawmill, and provide services at a shared cost.

Camp Darrington was primarily used to fight wildfires and develop infrastructure in the Darrington district of the Mount Baker National Forest, including roads, trails, and a series of fire lookout towers atop nearby mountains. Among its projects was the Mountain Loop Highway, which provided connections between ranger stations in Darrington and Granite Falls and also opened up the Cascades backcountry to logging and recreation. The camp employed the first wave of Appalachian emigrants from North Carolina, who would eventually form a majority of the town's population. Camp Darrington workers also assisted in the creation of two winter sports areas that were equipped with ski runs, toboggan trails, and a ski jump. The Works Progress Administration, another federal jobs program, provided funds to replace the town's overcrowded high school in 1936.

=== Incorporation and decline of lumber ===
Darrington reached a population of 600 residents in 1945 and was officially incorporated as a fourth-class town on October 15, 1945, following a 96–60 vote in favor. The townspeople celebrated by establishing an annual summer festival, the Timberbowl, which ran until 1967 and was initially used to raise funds for a fire engine and other equipment. A two-story town hall was built in 1947, housing the town council chambers, offices for town officials, the police department, the fire department, and a public library. In 1952, the town built a dedicated community center to serve as a venue for various social functions and a general gymnasium with seating for 1,200 people. A new high school and municipal airport opened in 1958 at opposite ends of the town.

Railroad companies with large timber holdings in the area began to leave in the 1960s, leading to the rise of independent "gyppo" loggers who salvaged discarded timber while under contract to regional paper mills. A large open-pit mine on Miners Ridge planned by Kennecott in the late 1960s was halted after intervention from environmental activists and local politicians. Northern Pacific ended passenger rail service to the Darrington area in the 1960s, and the passenger depot was demolished in 1967. The railroad was eventually abandoned in 1990 and its right-of-way was acquired by the county for conversion into a rail trail.

The gyppo operations gave way to a small local timber company, Summit Timber, which acquired the largest sawmill in Darrington, now the Hampton mill. Several smaller mills in Darrington and surrounding communities, including four for cedar shakes, closed during the 1960s, leading to further population decline. The area's timber industry was also adversely affected by tighter logging restrictions on federal lands during the 1980s and 1990s meant to protect the mountain habitats of threatened and endangered species, including the northern spotted owl. In response, Summit transitioned to processing private forests and lands managed by the Washington State Department of Natural Resources, maintaining its position as the town's largest employer. The loss of timber-industry jobs led to local protests, part of the "timber wars" that erupted across logging communities in the Pacific Northwest during the 1990s.

=== Tourism economy and modern Darrington ===
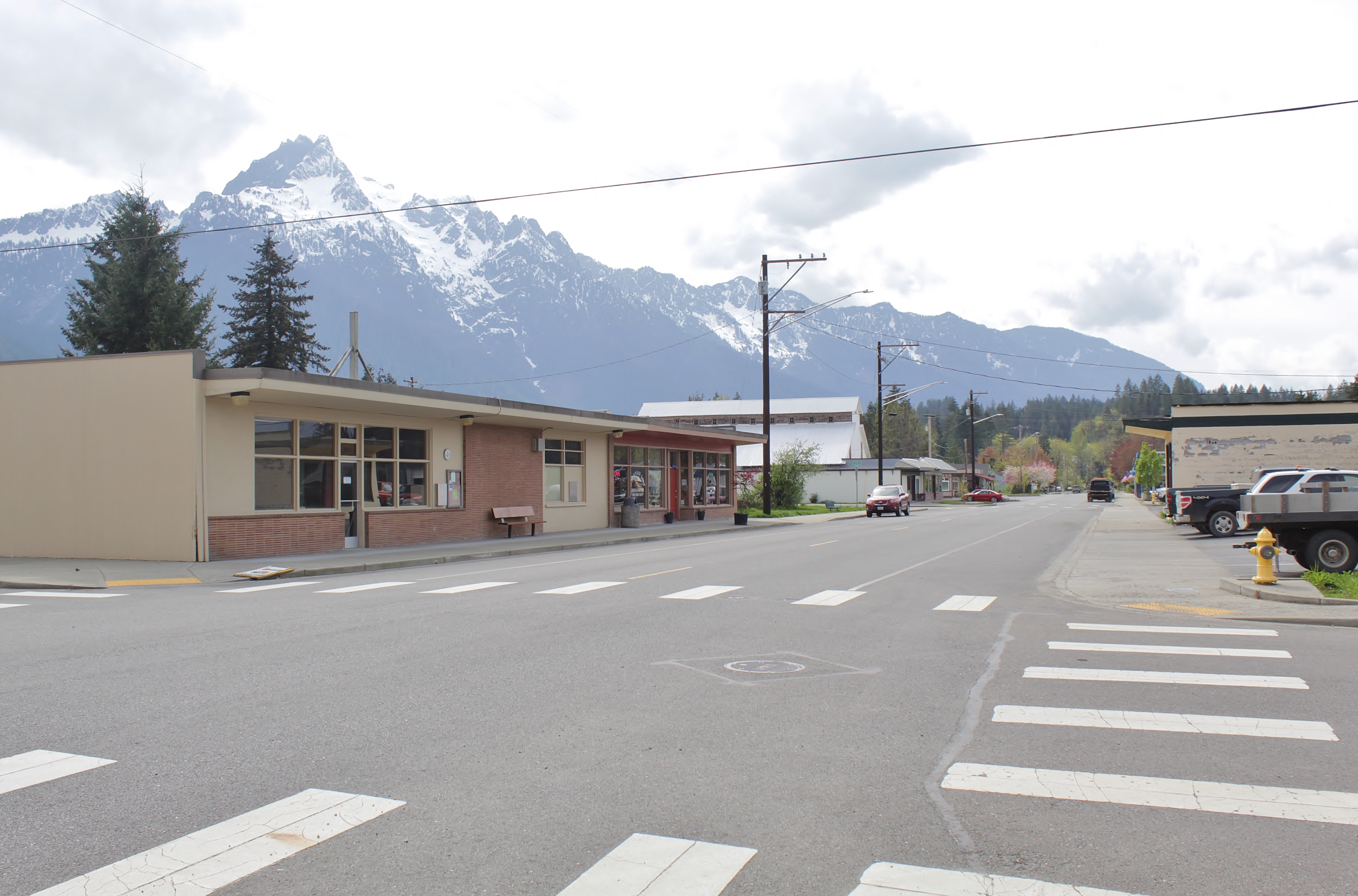
Darrington Street in downtown Darrington

The town government sought to diversify Darrington's economy and focus on tourism as an alternate industry, creating new festivals and promoting its existing bluegrass festival and rodeo. It adopted strong land use controls to preserve its rural character in the 1970s, which prevented new development until 2002. Darrington subsequently developed into a bedroom community for commuters working in Everett and Marysville. Opposition from residents forced the town government to drop plans for a 400-bed minimum-security prison work camp in 1990.

The town government unsuccessfully campaigned for a NASCAR racetrack and regional swimming center in the early 2000s, aiming to become an all-year destination for the county. Several major floods in the late 1990s and early 2000s damaged properties along the rivers; in 2003, a flood washed out part of the Mountain Loop Highway. The highway was not restored until 2008, costing Darrington approximately $750,000 in tourist revenue and forcing several businesses to close. Darrington's main lumber mill laid off 67 workers in 2011, citing the effects of the Great Recession and declining demand. The town government, running on a small budget of $1.6 million, accepted several grants from the state to upgrade its water system and repair streets during the recession.

On March 22, 2014, a major mudslide on a hillside near Oso, 12 miles (19 km) west of Darrington, destroyed dozens of homes and a section of State Route 530, cutting off direct road access between Arlington and Darrington for two months. It killed 43 people, becoming the deadliest landslide in U.S. history and the deadliest natural disaster in state history since the 1980 eruption of Mount St. Helens. Darrington was one of the main staging areas for disaster response workers and supplies; the community center was used as an emergency shelter for victims and the rodeo grounds became an animal shelter and housing for workers.

State Route 530 was partially reopened by early June and a permanent replacement was opened in September. The increased costs to local businesses resulting from the long detour via State Route 20 were mitigated with low-interest loans from the Small Business Administration and recovery funds, including $9.5 million in private donations. The tourism industry in Darrington also received a state-funded advertising campaign, keeping revenue and visitation for local events at pre-slide levels. The state government, together with the Economic Alliance Snohomish County and Washington State University, drafted a $65 million economic recovery plan that was put into effect in 2016.

== Geography ==
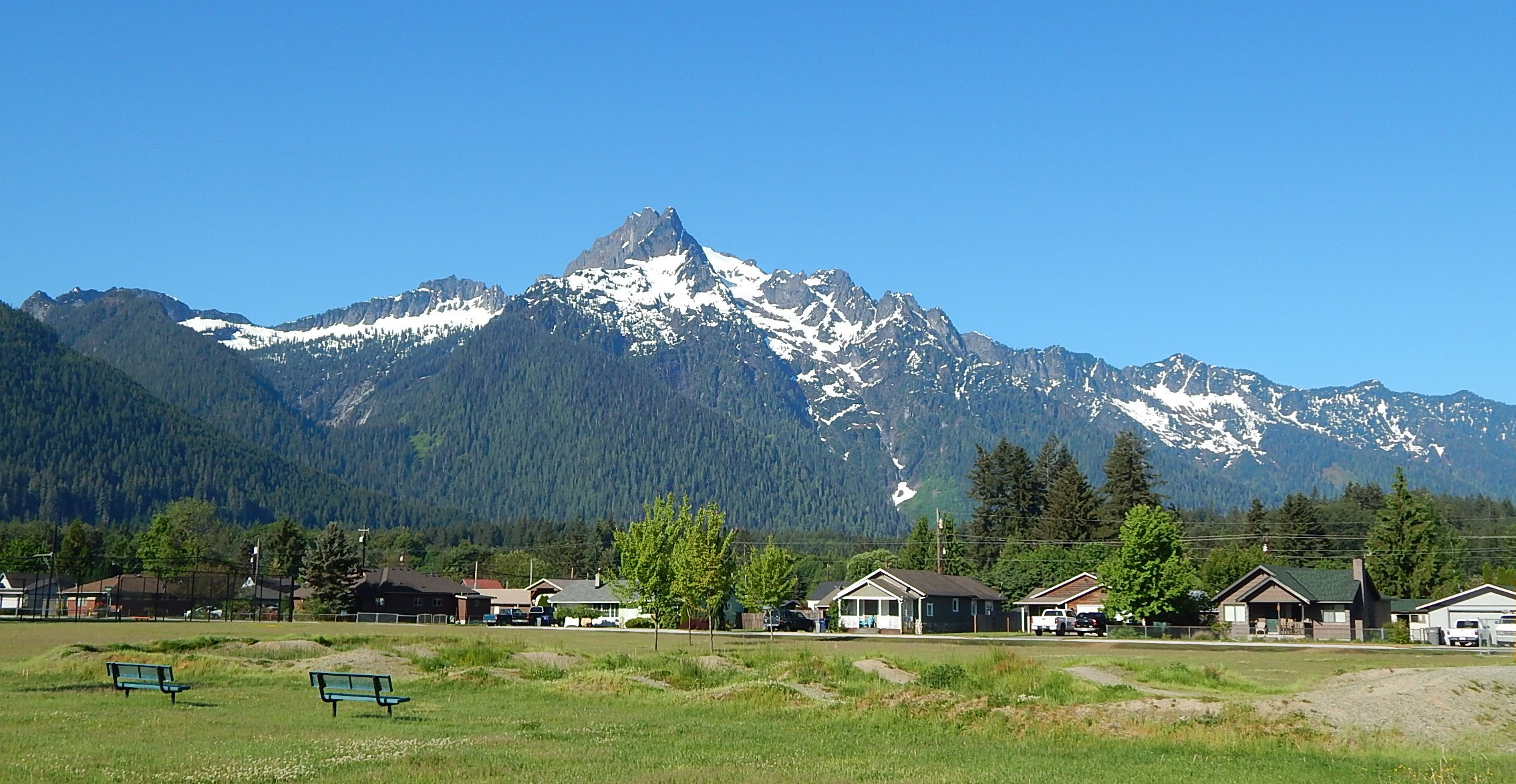
Whitehorse Mountain seen from Old School Park

Darrington is located in the northeastern reach of Snohomish County in Western Washington, just south of the Skagit County border. It is 28 miles (45 km) east of Arlington, the nearest city, and 74 miles (119 km) northeast of Seattle. According to the U.S. Census Bureau, the town has a total area of 1.67 square miles (4.33 km^{2}), of which, 1.65 square miles (4.27 km^{2}) is land and 0.02 square miles (0.05 km^{2}) is water.

Darrington is situated on a plain between the North Fork Stillaguamish River to the west and the Sauk River to the east. The plain is 5 miles (8.0 km) long and 1.5 miles (2.4 km) wide, at approximately 554 feet (169 m) above sea level in a valley between foothills of the Cascade Mountains, including the 6,852-foot (2,088 m) Whitehorse Mountain.

The plain was formed by lahar deposits from several eruptions of Glacier Peak, 25 miles (40 km) to the southeast. The area remains in the volcano's lahar hazard zone and also lies on a fault line that last produced a major earthquake less than 500 years ago. Soil in the Darrington area is primarily composed of glacial sands and gravels that have deposits of various mineral ores, including gold, silver, copper, lead, zinc, antimony, arsenic, mercury, and iron.

=== Climate ===
Darrington has a general climate similar to most of the Puget Sound lowlands and the Cascades foothills, with dry summers and mild, rainy winters moderated by a marine influence from the Pacific Ocean. Temperatures in Darrington typically differ by approximately 10 °F (5.6 °C) from Everett and other coastal cities in the county, with colder winters and warmer summers. The majority of the region's precipitation arrives during the winter and early spring, and Darrington averages 152 days of precipitation annually that totals 79.35 inches (201.5 cm) on average—significantly higher than areas in lowland Snohomish County. Darrington also receives significantly more snowfall than other cities in the county due to being in the mountains, with 10 to 15 days on average and approximately 39 inches (99 cm) of snowfall annually since 1911.

July is Darrington's warmest month, with average high temperatures of 77.5 °F (25.3 °C), and January is the coolest, at an average high of 40.8 °F (4.9 °C). The highest recorded temperature, 107 °F (42 °C), occurred in July 2007, and the lowest, −14 °F (−26 °C), in January 1950. According to the Köppen climate classification system, Darrington has a warm-summer Mediterranean climate (Csb).

Climate data for Darrington, Washington
Month	Jan	Feb	Mar	Apr	May	Jun	Jul	Aug	Sep	Oct	Nov	Dec	Year
Record high °F (°C)	74 (23)	70 (21)	82 (28)	91 (33)	103 (39)	105 (41)	107 (42)	105 (41)	104 (40)	94 (34)	77 (25)	65 (18)	107 (42)
Mean daily maximum °F (°C)	40.0 (4.4)	45.9 (7.7)	51.1 (10.6)	57.5 (14.2)	65.3 (18.5)	70.9 (21.6)	78.6 (25.9)	78.0 (25.6)	71.1 (21.7)	59.3 (15.2)	46.8 (8.2)	39.8 (4.3)	58.7 (14.8)
Mean daily minimum °F (°C)	29.2 (−1.6)	30.6 (−0.8)	33.8 (1.0)	36.9 (2.7)	43.4 (6.3)	48.5 (9.2)	52.0 (11.1)	51.8 (11.0)	46.1 (7.8)	40.1 (4.5)	33.7 (0.9)	29.7 (−1.3)	39.7 (4.2)
Record low °F (°C)	−14 (−26)	−11 (−24)	0 (−18)	20 (−7)	20 (−7)	31 (−1)	30 (−1)	24 (−4)	24 (−4)	16 (−9)	−4 (−20)	−10 (−23)	−14 (−26)
Average precipitation inches (mm)	11.84 (301)	8.73 (222)	8.44 (214)	5.16 (131)	3.60 (91)	2.83 (72)	1.43 (36)	1.63 (41)	3.62 (92)	7.39 (188)	11.84 (301)	12.85 (326)	79.36 (2,015)
Average snowfall inches (cm)	10.7 (27)	7.0 (18)	3.3 (8.4)	0.3 (0.76)	0 (0)	0 (0)	0 (0)	0 (0)	0 (0)	0.1 (0.25)	2.8 (7.1)	9.6 (24)	33.8 (85.51)
Average precipitation days	17	14	16	13	12	11	6	7	9	13	16	17	151
Source: Western Regional Climate Center

== Economy ==
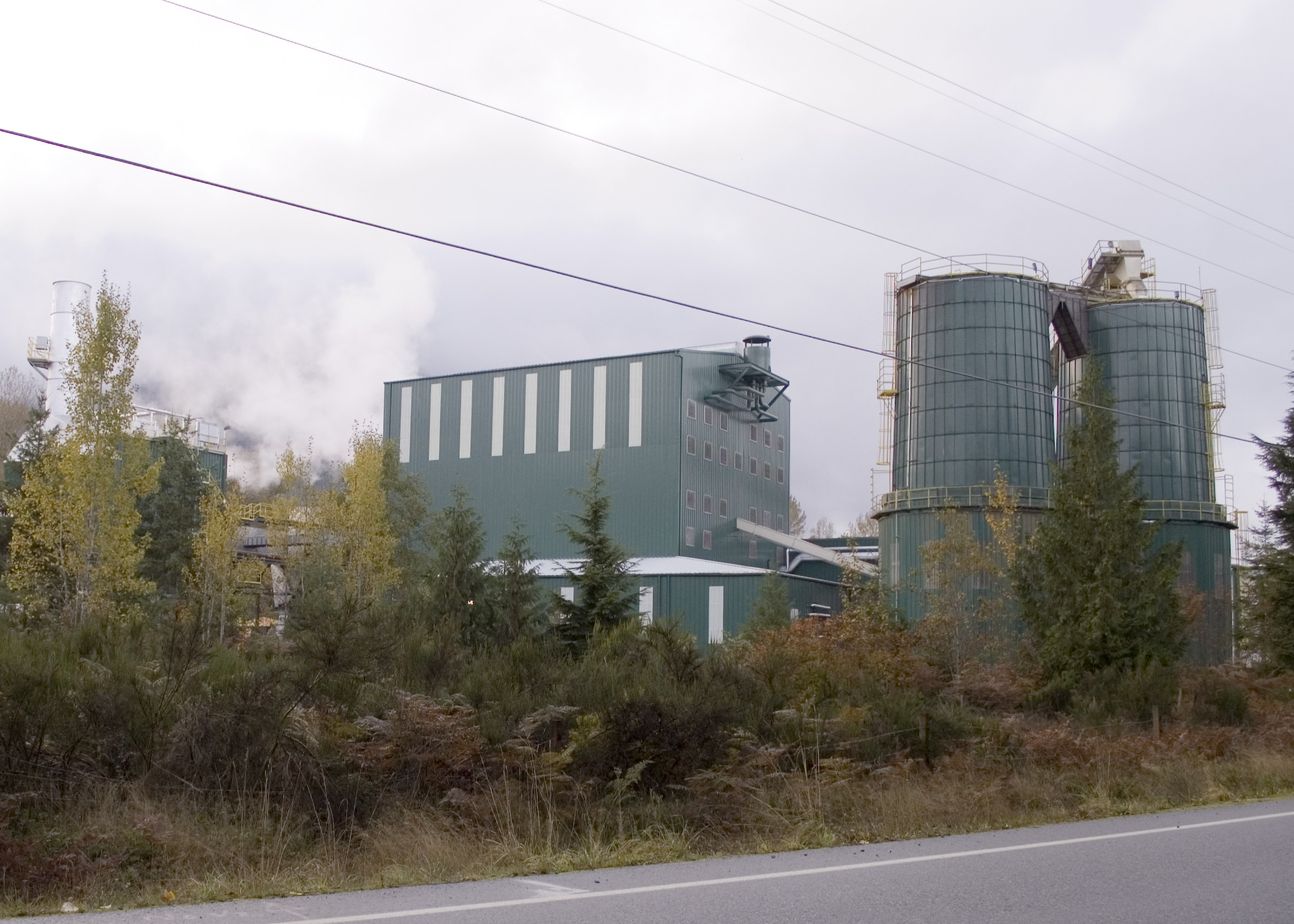
The Hampton lumber mill, Darrington's largest employer

Darrington's largest industry remains logging, centered around several small companies and the Hampton sawmill, the town's largest employer at 160 jobs. Hampton acquired the disused sawmill from Summit Timber in 2002 and reopened it the following year after $15 million in renovations. The sawmill primarily processes western hemlock and Douglas fir from nearby state and local lands. Other major industries in the town include tourism and outdoor recreation, educational services for the Darrington School District, and forestry management. The town has a grocery store, a bakery, several restaurants, a bookstore, and a microbrewery. The Sauk-Suiattle Indian Tribe had a small casino and bingo hall that employs 50 people until it closed in 2020.

A 2015 Census Bureau survey estimated that Darrington had a workforce population of 1,138 and an unemployment rate of 9.3 percent. The most common employers for Darrington residents are in manufacturing (23.8 percent), followed by educational and health services (17.6 percent), retail (13.7 percent), and public administration (10.5 percent). Approximately 9.9 percent of Darrington residents also work within the town, while 13 percent commute to Everett, 6.4 percent work in Seattle, and 5.7 percent work in Arlington. The average one-way commute for the town's workers is approximately 36.5 minutes; 85.3 percent of commuters drove alone to their workplace, while 6.8 percent carpooled and 6.2 percent walked or used other modes of transport.

== Demographics ==
Historical population
Census	Pop.	Note	%±
1950	921		—
1960	1,272		38.1%
1970	1,094		−14.0%
1980	1,064		−2.7%
1990	1,042		−2.1%
2000	1,136		9.0%
2010	1,347		18.6%
2020	1,462		8.5%
U.S. Decennial Census

Darrington is the third-smallest incorporated place in Snohomish County, ahead of Woodway and Index, with a population of 1,462 as of the 2020 census. Historically, the Darrington area's population peaked at an estimated 3,500 to 4,000 in the early 20th century during the heyday of logging in the area, which also attracted Scandinavian and Western European immigrants. The town saw an influx of Appalachian transplants from North Carolina (particularly the area around Sylva) in the 1940s and 1950s, whose families remain in the Darrington area, influencing traditions and local culture. The town's population has remained relatively stable since the 1960s, declining by 230 residents by 1990 and rebounding since then. Darrington predominantly has single-family residences, with only 36 multi-family units reported in 2010.

According to 2012 estimates by the U.S. Census Bureau, Darrington has a median family income of $60,750, and a per capita income of $18,047, ranking 227th of 281 areas within the state of Washington. Approximately 16.7 percent of families and 20.9 percent of the overall population were below the poverty line, including 24 percent of those under the age of 18 and 8.9 percent aged 65 or older. Darrington is described as economically depressed and has median household incomes that are far below the Snohomish County average.

=== 2020 census ===
As of the 2020 census, there were 1,462 people and 607 households living in Darrington, which had a population density of 93.8 inhabitants per square mile (36.2/km^{2}). There were 648 total housing units, of which 93.7% were occupied and 6.3% were vacant or for occasional use. The racial makeup of the town was 83.7% White, 3.4% Native American and Alaskan Native, 0.5% Black or African American, 0.5% Asian, and 0.2% Native Hawaiian and Pacific Islander. Residents who listed another race were 2.2% of the population and those who identified as more than one race were 9.6% of the population. Hispanic or Latino residents of any race were 4.9% of the population.

Of the 607 households in Darrington, 28.8% had children under the age of 18 living with them, 40.9% were married couples living together, and 11.5% were cohabitating but unmarried. Households with a male householder with no spouse or partner were 24.4% of the population, while households with a female householder with no spouse or partner were 23.2% of the population. Out of all households, 39.4% had residents who were 65 years of age or older. There were 607 occupied housing units in Darrington, of which 72.2% were owner-occupied and 27.8% were occupied by renters.

The median age in the town was 43.3 years old for all sexes. Of the total population, 21.7% of residents were under the age of 19; 24.3% were between the ages of 20 and 39; 34.9% were between the ages of 40 and 64; and 19.3% were 65 years of age or older. The gender makeup of the town was 50.3% male and 49.7% female.

=== 2010 census ===
As of the 2010 U.S. census, there were 1,347 people, 567 households, and 349 families residing in the town. The population density was 816.4 inhabitants per square mile (315.2/km^{2}). There were 644 housing units at an average density of 390.3 per square mile (150.7/km^{2}). The racial makeup of the town was 92.4 percent White, 2.4 percent Native American, 0.4 percent Asian, 0.5 percent from other races, and 4.2 percent from two or more races. Hispanic or Latino residents of any race were 3.2 percent of the population.

There were 567 households, of which 30.9 percent had children under the age of 18 living with them, 44.8 percent were married couples living together, 9.5 percent had a female householder with no husband present, 7.2 percent had a male householder with no wife present, and 38.4 percent were non-families. Individuals made up 32.6 percent of all households; and 13.1 percent had someone living alone who was 65 years of age or older. The average household size was 2.37 and the average family size was 2.96.

The median age in the town was 41.4 years. Residents under the age of 18 accounted for 22.7 percent of the population, 7.7 percent were between the ages of 18 and 24, 24.9 percent were from 25 to 44, 28.1 percent were from 45 to 64 and 16.6 percent were 65 years of age or older. The gender makeup of the town was 50.9 percent male and 49.1 percent female.

== Government and politics ==
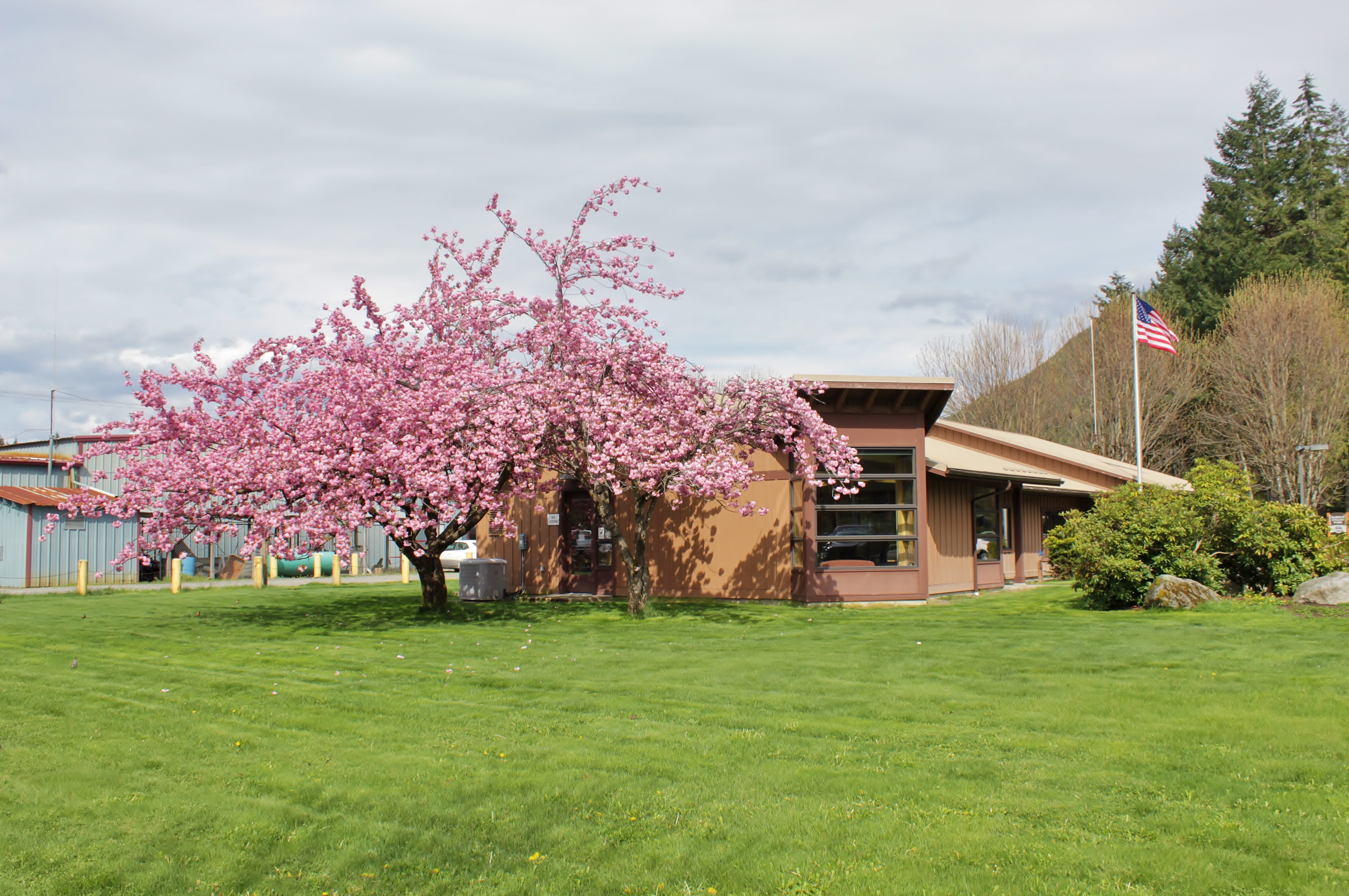
Darrington's town hall, which also houses a public library operated by Sno-Isle Libraries

Darrington is an incorporated town that operates under a mayor–council form of government. It is one of two towns within Snohomish County, the other being Index, the only incorporated place in the county with a smaller population than Darrington. The five town council members regularly meet twice per month and are elected to four-year terms alongside the mayor. The current mayor, Dan Rankin, a sawmill owner and former councilmember, was elected in 2011; he has twice been re-elected.

The town government handles and manages public safety, public works, administration, and parks and recreation. It also operates a public cemetery, the municipal airport, and contracts for utility services. The mayor and town council appoint a clerk treasurer and the heads of various government departments.

As of 2016, the town government employs seven people and has an annual budget of $3 million. The town has an independent fire department with two stations, but contracts with the Snohomish County Sheriff for policing and emergency services. The town also has a public library branch operated by the Sno-Isle Libraries system and located in the town hall complex, which was built in 1990 and expanded in 2008. The town lacks home delivery of mail, requiring residents to use the local post office.

At the federal level, Darrington is part of the 8th congressional district, which encompasses the eastern portions of the Snohomish, King, and Pierce counties as well as the entirety of Chelan and Kittitas counties. The town was part of the 1st congressional district until 2022. At the state level, Darrington shares the 39th legislative district with Lake Stevens, Granite Falls, and eastern Skagit County. The town lies in the Snohomish County Council's 1st district, which includes most of the county north of Everett and Lake Stevens.

While Snohomish County as a whole favors the Democratic Party in elections, Darrington has generally supported Republican candidates. During the 2016 U.S. presidential election, Darrington had the highest percentage of votes in Snohomish County for Republican Donald Trump, at 61 percent compared to 33 percent for Democrat Hillary Clinton, who carried the county. Similarly, in the same year's gubernatorial election, 59 percent of Darrington voters preferred Republican Bill Bryant over incumbent Democrat Jay Inslee, who was re-elected. Some Democrats have succeeded in Darrington, however. In the 2012 presidential election, Barack Obama won the town with 52 percent of the vote.

== Culture ==
Darrington describes itself as a self-sufficient and tight-knit community, owing to its isolation and small population. Descendants of emigrants from North Carolina, particularly the Sylva area, after World War II, shaped many of the traditions and customs in the Darrington area. The term "going down below" is sometimes used among Darrington residents to refer to trips outside of the town. Memorial dinners and fundraisers during funerals are hosted by its residents, typically attended by up to a fourth of the town's population. Darrington also has a strong tradition of volunteerism, which it sometimes relies on in lieu of municipal services.

=== Events and festivals ===
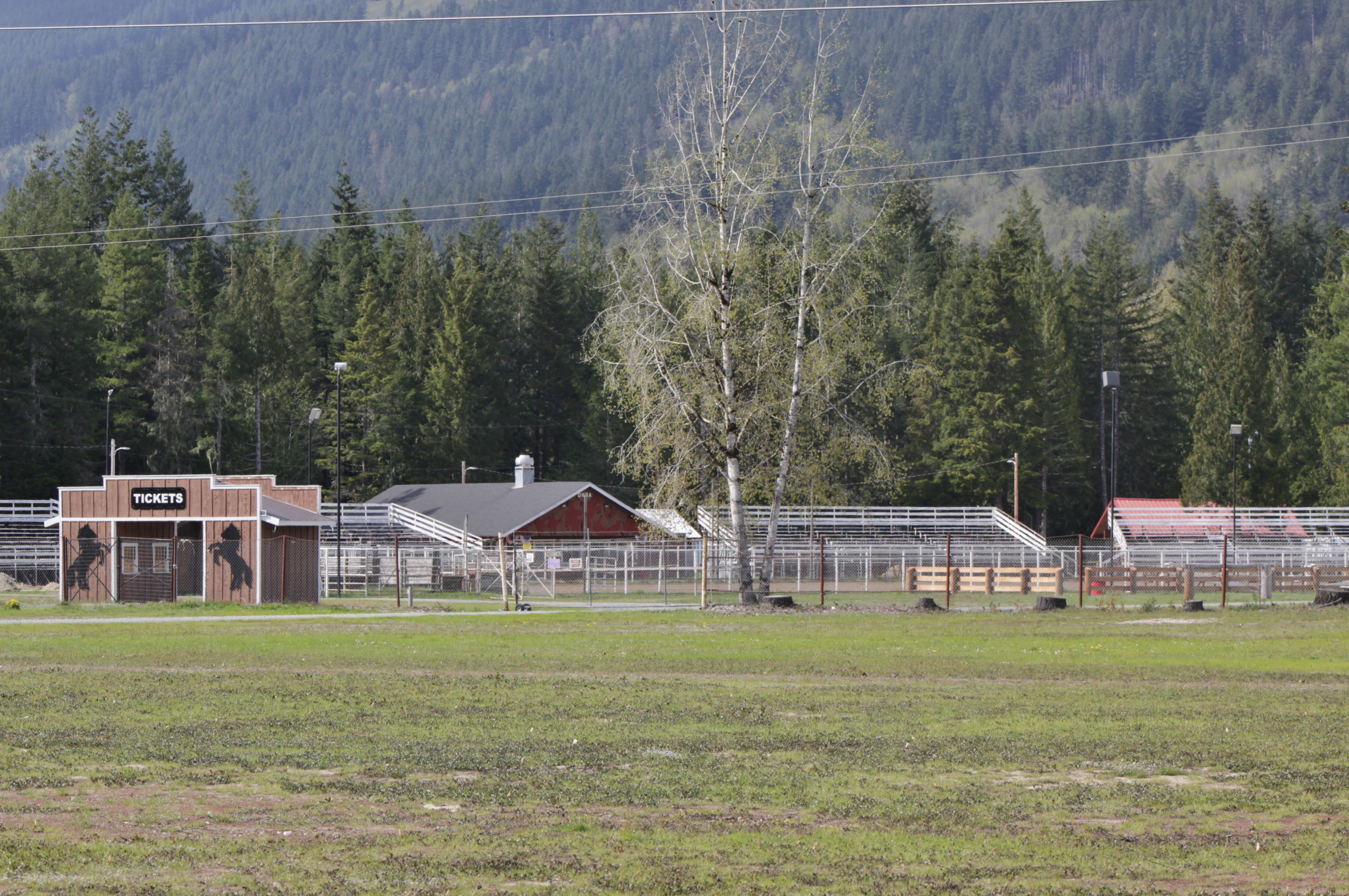
The host grounds of the Darrington rodeo

Darrington has a community events complex and park located 3 miles (4.8 km) west of the town, which is home to several annual events, including a rodeo and a Bluegrass festival. The Darrington Timberbowl Rodeo began in 1964 and typically draws over a thousand spectators during its two-day run in late June. The rodeo was cancelled in 2013 after an inspection found the venue's bleachers to be unsafe, but $25,000 in repairs funded by state grants allowed it to resume the following year. The Timberbowl Rodeo is named for a former festival that was held annually in late June from 1946 to 1967, and featured various logging events and competitions in addition to a town parade.

The Darrington Bluegrass Festival is held for three days every July and was started in 1977 by descendants of Appalachian transplants to the area. The festival draws around 10,000 people, including visitors who use an adjacent campground and participate in communal jam sessions. Prominent Bluegrass groups, including Bill Monroe, the Gibson Brothers, and Rural Delivery, have performed at Darrington's Whitehorse Mountain Amphitheater. From 2006 to 2019, the amphitheater also hosted the Summer Meltdown jam festival in early August, which attracted a wide variety of musical acts. The four-day event typically drew 4,000 visitors and 40 acts, as well as art pieces that were installed around the campgrounds. Both festivals were cancelled in 2020 due to the COVID-19 pandemic.

The town also has several other annual events, including Darrington Day in late May, a Fourth of July parade, and a street fair in July. Darrington formerly hosted an annual wildflower festival and an annual Christian music festival in the 1990s during the transition to a tourism-based economy.

=== Media ===
With no local newspaper, events in Darrington are covered by Everett's daily newspaper, the Herald, a daily publication from Everett, and the weekly Arlington Times. The town's first newspaper, named The Wrangler, was published from 1907 to 1915 by the Darrington Literary Society. A second newspaper, The Darrington News, was published for two years from 1947 to 1949 and was followed by the Timber Bowl Tribune, which was printed in Darrington and Concrete using a plant owned by The Concrete Herald. The Tribune was active from 1955 to 1958, when it was folded into the Arlington Times.

=== Parks and recreation ===
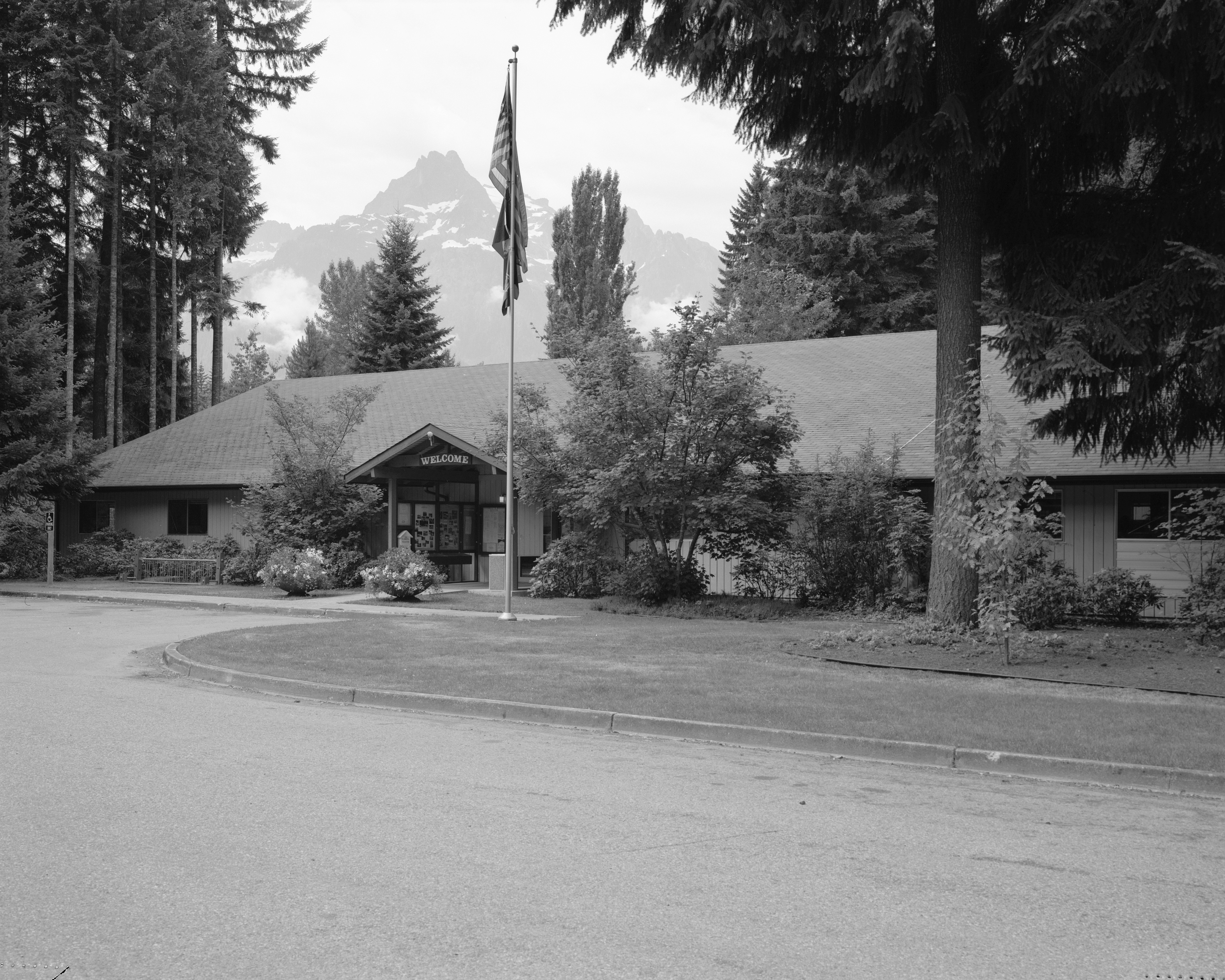
The headquarters of the Darrington Ranger District, a unit of the Mount Baker–Snoqualmie National Forest

Darrington is surrounded by the Mount Baker–Snoqualmie National Forest and serves as the headquarters of the Darrington Ranger District, a unit of the U.S. Forest Service. The area includes three designated wilderness areas, Glacier Peak, Henry M. Jackson, and Boulder River, and over 300 miles (480 km) of hiking and backcountry trails that are also open to mountain biking and horseback riding. Darrington has several campgrounds, roadside recreational areas, fishing areas, and whitewater rafting courses along the Sauk and Suiattle rivers. The Mountain Loop Highway connects Darrington to various scenic areas, including birdwatching hotspots and the Pacific Crest Trail system.

The town government also maintains several small parks in Darrington, totaling 24 acres (9.7 ha) of open space. Old School Park sits within view of Whitehorse Mountain and has a gazebo, a playground, a skate park, and a pump track for bicycles. Harold Engles Park has a disc golf course and a lawn, and Nels Bruseth Memorial Garden has historic exhibits and a rhododendron garden. The Snohomish County government owns and operates Whitehorse Community Park, which includes several baseball and softball fields on 80 acres (32 ha) north of the town that opened in 2007. Darrington is the only town in the state to have a permanent archery range, which is one of three that regularly hosts events organized by the National Field Archery Association. The archery complex includes six full ranges, trails, concession stands, and 190 acres (77 ha) of reserved space. The town also has a community center that was built in 1954 and typically functions as a gymnasium and gathering space.

=== Historic preservation ===
The town has a small historical society that preserves photographs and other documents for research. The Darrington Ranger District has four structures listed on the National Register of Historic Places (NRHP). The ranger station in Darrington was listed in 1991, while the fire lookouts on Three Fingers, Miners Ridge, and Green Mountain were listed in 1987 and 1988. The Green Mountain lookout was to be removed since its maintenance requires helicopters and other machinery, until passage of the Green Mountain Lookout Heritage Protection Act by the U.S. Congress in 2014 provided funds for a restoration project.

=== Notable people ===
- Bob Barker, former game show host of The Price Is Right; born in Darrington
- Nels Bruseth, forest ranger, artist, and naturalist

== Education ==
The Darrington School District operates two public schools in the town that enroll 414 students during the 2016–17 school year. It employs 31 teachers and administrations, and 50 other staff members. The district primarily serves Darrington and areas east of Oso, as well as areas in Skagit County that are near the Sauk-Suiattle Reservation. The town's elementary school, serving kindergarten through eight grade, was opened in 1990 and shares its campus with the high school. The mascot for the school is the Darrington Loggers, named after the town's historic principal industry. Loggers teams have won state championships in various sports during the 1950s, 1980s, and 1990s.

== Infrastructure ==
=== Transportation ===
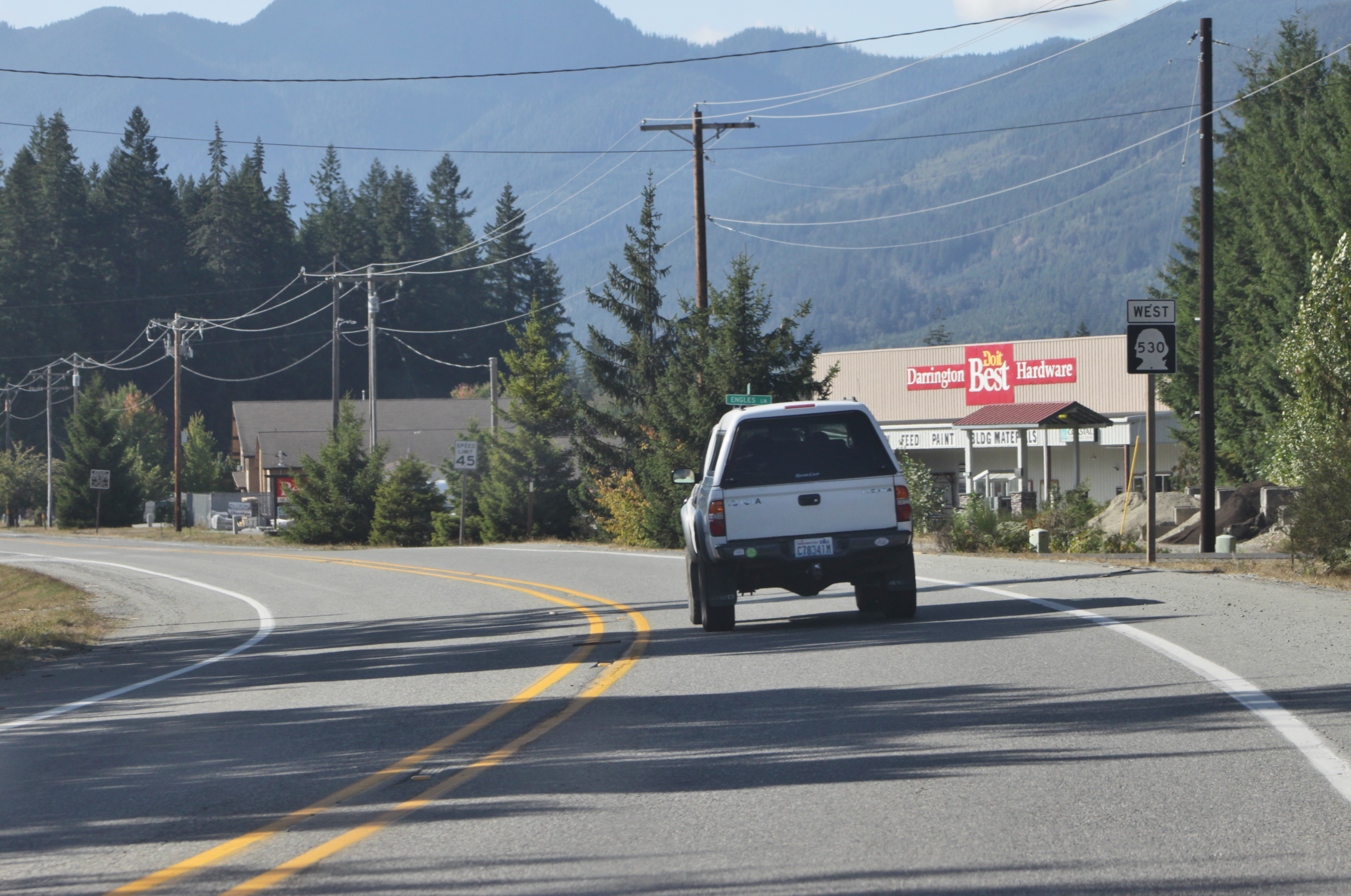
Looking westbound on State Route 530 as it leaves Darrington

Darrington is located along State Route 530, which travels 28 miles (45 km) west towards Arlington and north to State Route 20 at Rockport. The highway carries a daily average of approximately 3,300 vehicles west of the town and 2,300 vehicles north of the town towards the Sauk-Suiattle Reservation. Darrington has a third highway connection through the Mountain Loop Highway, a backcountry scenic byway that runs 54 miles (87 km) south through the Cascades and west to Granite Falls. It is closed in the winter and is considered unsuitable for commercial traffic, in part due to a 14-mile (23 km) dirt and gravel section.

The area is also served by Community Transit, the main public transportation agency for most of Snohomish County. Route 230 connects Darrington to Oso, Arlington, and a transit center in Smokey Point twice a day during rush hour. The agency expanded its Zip Shuttle microtransit service to Darrington and the surrounding area in December 2024. The Sauk-Suiattle Indian Tribe operates a bus route serving Darrington, its reservation, and Concrete. It has six daily round trips and launched in 2016 with grants from the state and federal governments.

The Whitehorse Trail, a recreational trail for hikers, cyclists, and horseback riders, is being developed by the county government to connect Darrington with Arlington. It follows the Northern Pacific's 1901 route, sold to the county in 1993. The town government operates a small airport, Darrington Municipal Airport, which has a single paved runway suitable for general aviation and other activities.

=== Utilities ===
Electric power for Darrington residents and businesses is provided by the Snohomish County Public Utility District (PUD), a consumer-owned public utility that serves all of Snohomish County. The Hampton mill operates a small biomass cogeneration plant in Darrington that produces electricity from steam power by burning wood from the Hampton Lumber sawmill. The 7 MW plant was installed in 2006 after an earlier proposal by the National Energy Systems Company (NESCO) for a similar plant that would have generated up to 20 MW was rejected. The NESCO proposal was withdrawn in 2004 over local concerns about air pollution and environmental degradation to the nearby National Forest lands. The town lacks natural gas service and relies on wood-burning stoves for building heat, some of which have been replaced by the Puget Sound Clean Air Agency due to their impact on air quality.

Ziply Fiber is the only land-based provider of Internet and telephone service to Darrington, using a fiber-optic cable laid along State Route 530. The state government awarded a $16.5 million grant in 2022 to improve broadband and fiber service in northern Snohomish County, including Darrington. The installation of new fiber-optic lines and connections to 4,000 households along the State Route 530 corridor is scheduled to be completed by 2025. A non-profit internet provider was started by local residents in 2017 to address the lack of broadband service in the area.

The town government provides water from a pair of wells, and water treatment, to 534 structures. Darrington is one of several small communities in Snohomish County without a municipal sewer system, instead relying on septic tanks. The town government has considered installing a sewage system several times in the 1990s and 2000s, but those plans have stalled due to the $6.5 million cost (as estimated in 2000) and the land needed for a treatment plant. Solid waste and recycling collection is contracted out by the town government to Waste Management.

=== Health care ===
Darrington's nearest general hospital is the Cascade Valley Hospital in Arlington. The town also has a medical clinic operated by Skagit Regional Health and staffed by a single doctor. The clinic was established in 1958 and operated by Cascade Valley Hospital until it was absorbed into the Skagit system. The town has periodically gone for years without a doctor, notably substituting a registered nurse to provide the majority of medical care in the early 1970s. Darrington's lone pharmacy was established in 1917 and closed in 2023 after its owner was unable to sell the business. The nearest pharmacy is in Arlington, a 56-mile (90 km) round trip.
