= Darrington Municipal Airport =

- IATA: none; ICAO: none; FAA LID: 1S2

Summary
- Airport type: Public
- Owner: Town of Darrington
- Operator: Town of Darrington
- Serves: Darrington, Washington
- Elevation AMSL: 553 ft (169 m)
- Coordinates: 48°15′31″N 121°36′36″W
- Website: Town of Darrington
- Interactive map of Darrington Municipal Airport

Runways
Direction	Length		Surface
Direction	ft	m	Surface
10/28	2,491	759	Asphalt

Statistics
- Aircraft operations (2016): 2,310
- Based aircraft (2016): 11
- Source: Federal Aviation Administration

Darrington Municipal Airport (FAA LID: 1S2) is a public airport located in Darrington, a rural town in Snohomish County, Washington, United States. It is owned and operated by the town government and is situated west–east along the north side of State Route 530.

The airport has a single, paved runway that measures 2,491 feet (0.759 km) in length. It is primarily used for general aviation purposes. Darrington constructed the airport in 1958 and added several hangars in the 1980s. The airport has also hosted various events, including the first editions of the local rodeo in the 1960s. The west end of the airport grounds is used as a local cemetery.

== See also ==
- List of airports in Washington
