= Hazel, Washington =

Unincorporated community in Washington, United States

- Unincorporated community
- Location within Washington (state) Location within the United States
- Coordinates: 48°16′38″N 121°48′32″W
- Country: United States
- State: Washington
- County: Snohomish
- Time zone: UTC-8 (Pacific (PST))
  - Summer (DST): UTC-7 (PDT)

Hazel is an unincorporated community in Snohomish County, in the U.S. state of Washington.

== History ==
Prior to European settlement, the Stillaguamish had a village site located opposite the site of the old town, on the banks of the north fork of the Stillaguamish River. There were two large winter houses, with around 150-200 people living here.

A post office called Hazel was established in 1903, and remained in operation until 1927. The community was named after the daughter of a first settler.
