= Trafton, Washington =

Unincorporated community in Washington, United States

- Unincorporated community
- Location within Washington (state) Location within the United States
- Coordinates: 48°14′13″N 122°03′31″W
- Country: United States
- State: Washington
- County: Snohomish
- Time zone: UTC-8 (Pacific (PST))
  - Summer (DST): UTC-7 (PDT)

Trafton is a small unincorporated community located in Snohomish County, Washington. It is located near the city of Arlington, and although many things in the area are named Trafton (such as the historic Trafton School and Trafton Cemetery), most residents consider themselves residents of Arlington.

== Etymology ==
The community derives its name from Trafalgar, Indiana.

== History ==
Before European settlement, the Stillaguamish had built a large winter village along the river, next to what is now the current site of Trafton. The village was called chuck-kol-che, with only the early transliteration of the native Lushootseed name being known. There were at least 200 people living at the village, with permanent structures including a large longhouse, a smaller house, and a smokehouse. One of the village headmen, or "chiefs," was chad-is.
