= Oso, Washington =

Census-designated place in Snohomish County, Washington, United States

- CDP
- Location of Oso, Washington
- Coordinates: 48°16′20″N 121°55′9″W
- Country: United States
- State: Washington
- County: Snohomish

Area
  - Total: 3.7 sq mi (9.6 km^{2})
  - Land: 3.6 sq mi (9.4 km^{2})
  - Water: 0.077 sq mi (0.2 km^{2})
- Elevation: 207 ft (63 m)

Population (2020)
  - Total: 172
  - Density: 47/sq mi (18/km^{2})
- Time zone: UTC-8 (Pacific (PST))
  - Summer (DST): UTC-7 (PDT)
- ZIP Code: 98223
- Area code: 360, 564
- FIPS code: 53-52110
- GNIS feature ID: 1524091

Oso is a census-designated place (CDP) in Snohomish County, Washington, United States. It is located to the west of Darrington, south of the North Fork of the Stillaguamish River and approximately 50 air miles (80 km) from Seattle. The population of Oso was 172 at the 2020 census. The area was the site of a large landslide in March 2014 that killed 43 people, the deadliest incident of its kind in U.S. history.

== History ==
The town was originally named Allen, but was renamed to Oso to avoid confusion with Allyn in Mason County. Oso is Spanish for bear and was named by J. P. Britzius after the town of Oso, Texas in Fayette County. The Texas town no longer exists, having been abandoned in favor of the nearby town of Flatonia which had a railway station.

=== 2014 mudslide ===
On Saturday, March 22, 2014, at 10:37 a.m. local time, a major mudflow occurred 4 miles (6.4 km) east of Oso, when a portion of an unstable hill collapsed, sending mud and debris across the North Fork of the Stillaguamish River, engulfing a rural neighborhood, and covering an area of approximately 1 square mile (2.6 km^{2}). Forty-three people were killed.

=== 2016 wildfire ===
In May 2016, a wildfire grew off State Route 530 near Oso. As of May 13, the wildfire had spread to over 100 acres (40 ha).

== Geography ==
Oso is located along the Stillaguamish River North Fork, which forms a valley between several arms of the Cascade Range. The community is accessible via State Route 530, which continues 12 miles (19 km) west to Arlington and 16 miles (26 km) east to Darrington.

Oso is located at 48°16′20″N 121°55′9″W (48.272281, −121.919235). The United States Census Bureau defines the Oso CDP as extending north from the river to the Skagit County border. It has a total area of 3.7 square miles (9.6 km^{2}), of which, 3.6 square miles (9.4 km^{2}) of it is land and 0.1 square miles (0.2 km^{2}) of it (2.43%) is water.

== Demographics ==
Historical population
Census	Pop.	Note	%±
2000	246		—
2010	180		−26.8%
2020	172		−4.4%
U.S. Decennial Census; 1970 1980 1990; 2000 2010

Oso first appeared as a census designated place in the 2000 U.S. census.

=== Racial and ethnic composition ===
Oso CDP, Washington – Racial and ethnic composition Note: the US Census treats Hispanic/Latino as an ethnic category. This table excludes Latinos from the racial categories and assigns them to a separate category. Hispanics/Latinos may be of any race.
Race / Ethnicity (NH = Non-Hispanic)	Pop 2000	Pop 2010	Pop 2020	% 2000	% 2010	% 2020
White alone (NH)	244	167	144	99.19%	92.78%	83.72%
Black or African American alone (NH)	1	1	1	0.41%	0.56%	0.58%
Native American or Alaska Native alone (NH)	0	1	3	0.00%	0.56%	1.74%
Asian alone (NH)	0	1	1	0.00%	0.56%	0.58%
Native Hawaiian or Pacific Islander alone (NH)	0	0	0	0.00%	0.00%	0.00%
Other race alone (NH)	0	0	2	0.00%	0.00%	1.16%
Mixed race or Multiracial (NH)	0	1	11	0.00%	0.56%	6.40%
Hispanic or Latino (any race)	1	9	10	0.41%	5.00%	5.81%
Total	246	180	172	100.00%	100.00%	100.00%

=== 2000 census ===
As of the census of 2000, there were 246 people, 96 households, and 69 families residing in the CDP. The population density was 68.0 people per square mile (26.2/km^{2}). There were 102 housing units at an average density of 28.2/sq mi (10.9/km^{2}). The racial makeup of the CDP was 99.19% White, 0.41% African American, and 0.41% from other races. Hispanic or Latino of any race were 0.41% of the population.

There were 96 households, out of which 37.5% had children under the age of 18 living with them, 60.4% were married couples living together, 8.3% had a female householder with no husband present, and 28.1% were non-families. 22.9% of all households were made up of individuals, and 11.5% had someone living alone who was 65 years of age or older. The average household size was 2.56 and the average family size was 3.01.

In the CDP, the age distribution of the population shows 28.5% under the age of 18, 5.7% from 18 to 24, 27.2% from 25 to 44, 24.4% from 45 to 64, and 14.2% who were 65 years of age or older. The median age was 37 years. For every 100 females, there were 95.2 males. For every 100 females age 18 and over, there were 95.6 males.

The median income for a household in the CDP was $75,315, and the median income for a family was $78,786. Males had a median income of $39,489 versus $21,250 for females. The per capita income for the CDP was $23,700. None of the population or families were below the poverty line.

== Education ==
The community is served by the Arlington School District.

== Points of interest ==
- Jim Creek Naval Radio Station
