= Green Mountain (Snohomish County, Washington) =

Mountain in Washington (state), United States

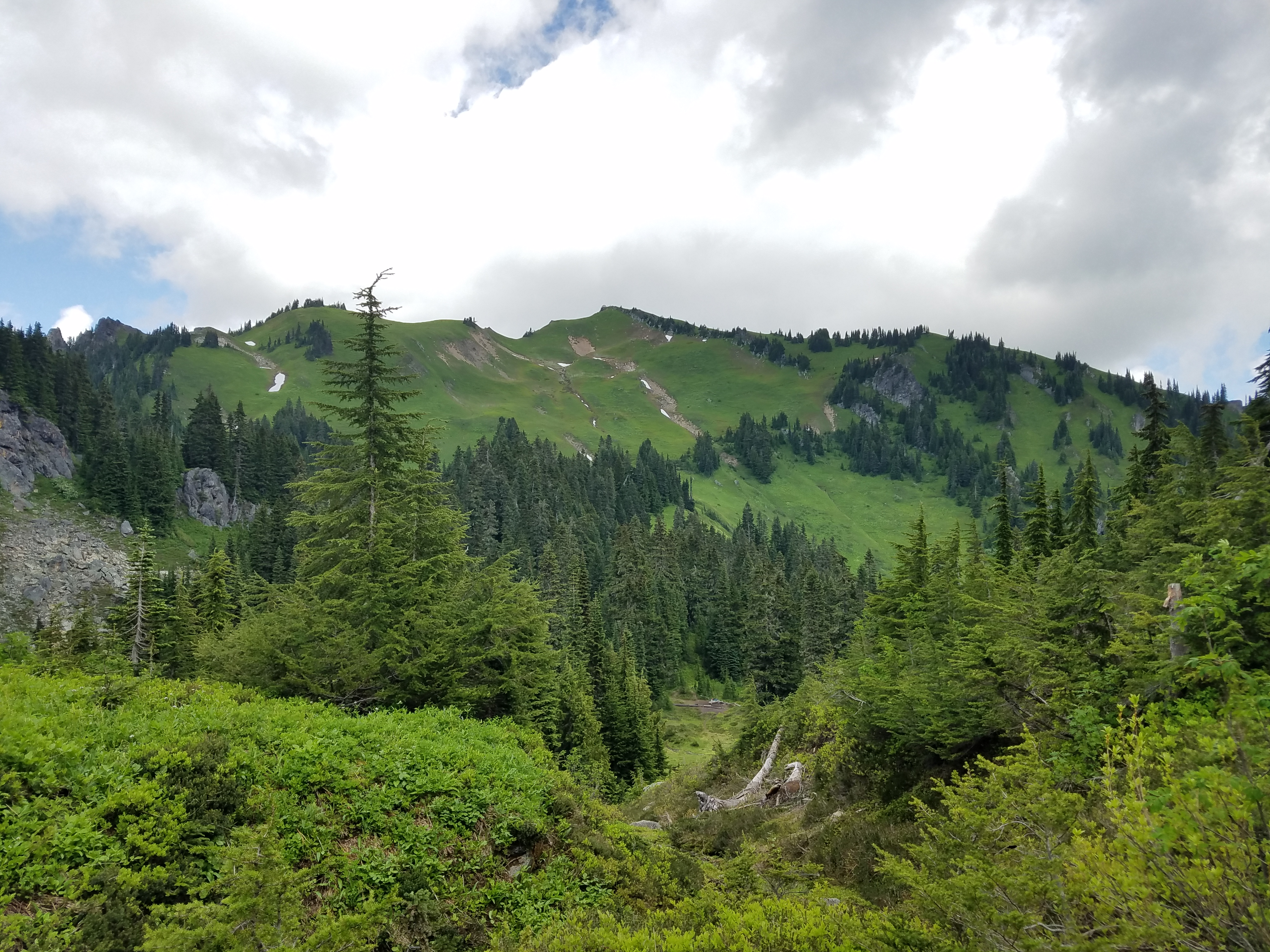
- Green Mountain viewed from trail.

Highest point
- Elevation: 6,398 ft (1,950 m) NGVD 29
- Prominence: 740 ft (230 m)
- Coordinates: 48°17′30″N 121°14′19″W

Geography
- Location within Washington (state) Location within the United States
- Interactive map of Green Mountain
- Country: United States
- State: Washington
- County: Snohomish
- Protected area: Glacier Peak Wilderness
- Topo map(s): USGS Downey Mountain, WA

Climbing
- Easiest route: Hiking

Green Mountain is a peak in the Glacier Peak Wilderness above the Suiattle River in Snohomish County, Washington. It is notable for being the site of the Green Mountain Lookout, which was preserved by an Act of Congress in 2014.

== Climate ==
Green Mountain is located in the marine west coast climate zone of western North America. Most weather fronts originating in the Pacific Ocean travel northeast toward the Cascade Mountains. As fronts approach the North Cascades, they are forced upward by the peaks of the Cascade Range (orographic lift), causing them to drop their moisture in the form of rain or snowfall onto the Cascades. As a result, the west side of the North Cascades experiences high precipitation, especially during the winter months in the form of snowfall. Because of maritime influence, snow tends to be wet and heavy, resulting in high avalanche danger. During winter months, weather is usually cloudy, but due to high pressure systems over the Pacific Ocean that intensify during summer months, there is often little or no cloud cover during the summer. Due to its temperate climate and proximity to the Pacific Ocean, areas west of the Cascade Crest very rarely experience temperatures below 0 °F (−18 °C) or above 80 °F (27 °C).

== Gallery ==
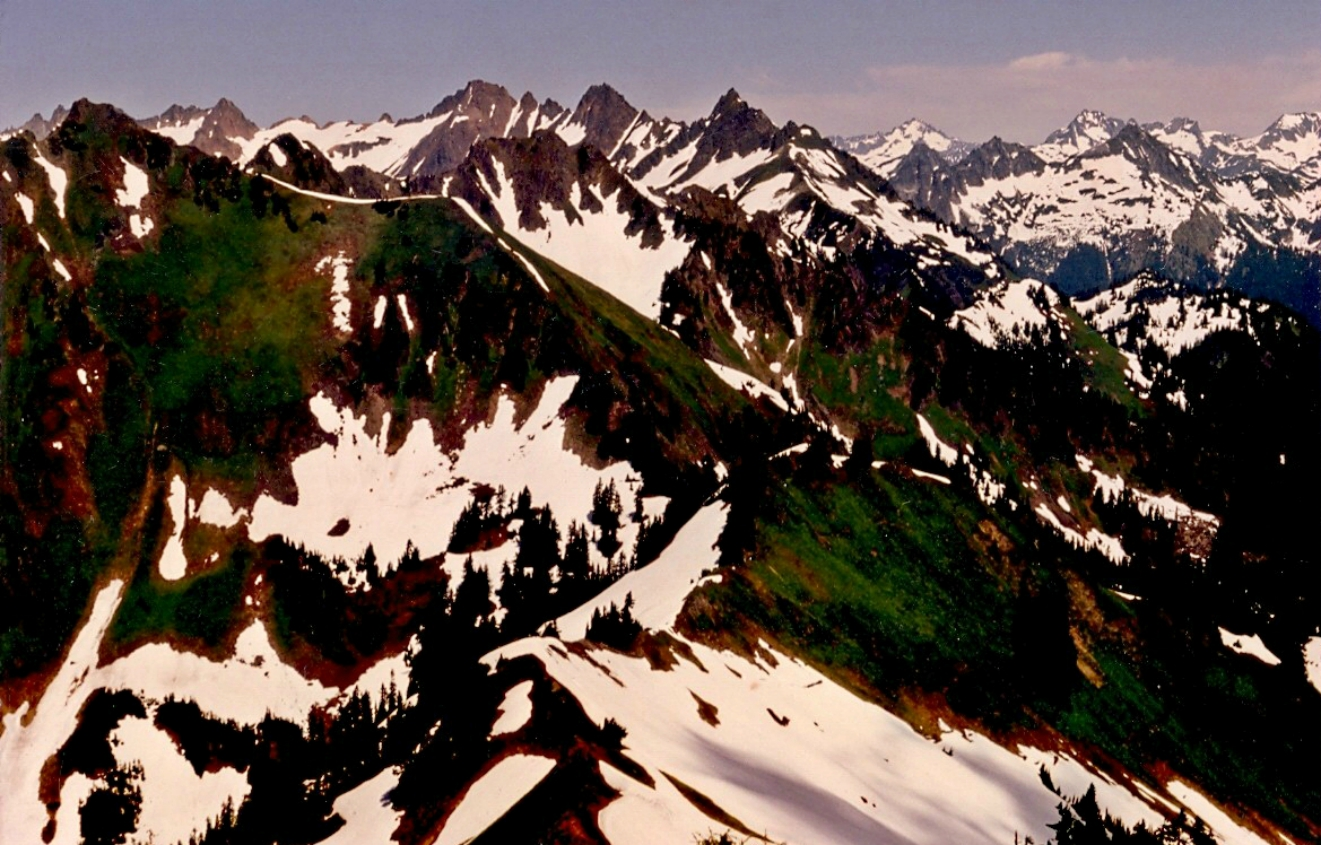
Green Mountain's summit view of the North Cascades featuring Mount Buckindy and Mount Misch
