= Sweet Alchemy =

Ice creamery based in Seattle, Washington, U.S.

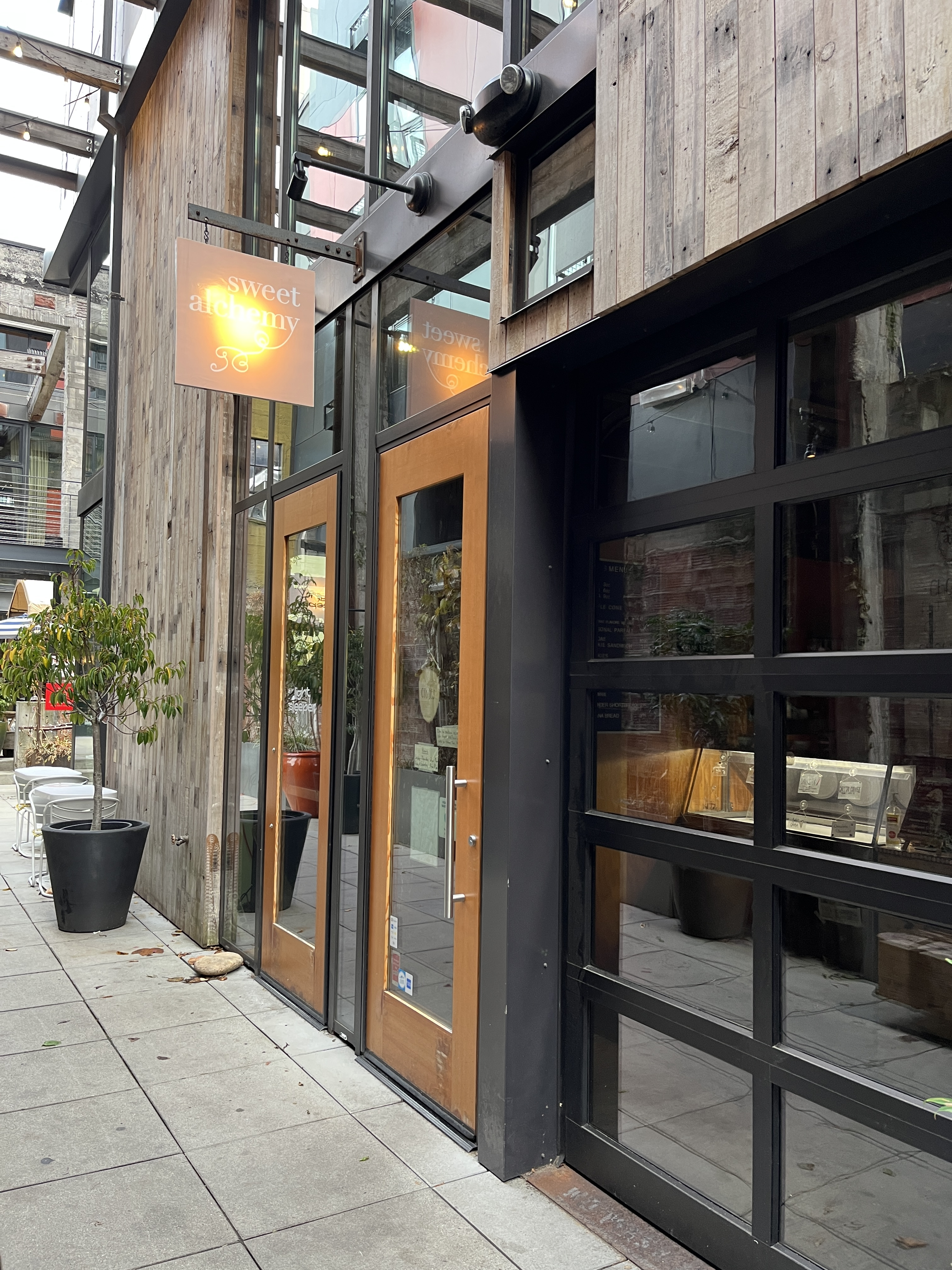
- Exterior of the shop in Chophouse Row on Seattle's Capitol Hill, 2022
- Interactive map of Sweet Alchemy

Restaurant information
- Established: 2016
- Owner: Lois Ko
- Location: Seattle, King, Washington, United States
- Coordinates: 47.6599°N 122.3134°W
- Website: sweetalchemyicecreamery.com

Sweet Alchemy Ice Creamery, or simply Sweet Alchemy, is an ice creamery based in Seattle, Washington. The business has operated shops in the University District and Ballard neighborhoods and on Capitol Hill. Owner Lois Ko opened the first location near the University of Washington in 2016. The Ballard location opened in 2019 and shared a space with Mighty-O Donuts, and the Capitol Hill shop opened in Chophouse Row in 2020. Sweet Alchemy offers a variety of ice cream and other desserts, and makes cakes, cones, cookies, and toppings in-house. The business pasteurizes its dairy from local farms daily. It has garnered a positive reception and is considered among Seattle's best ice cream shops.

== Description ==
The small batch ice creamery Sweet Alchemy has operated shops in Seattle's University District and Ballard neighborhoods and in Chophouse Row, a mixed-use development on Capitol Hill. The student publication of the University of Washington (UW) has described the business as a "minority-, woman-owned scoop shop" with seasonal varieties that focuses on sustainability and sourcing ingredients from local farmers.

Sweet Alchemy pasteurizes its dairy daily from local farms, including Fresh Breeze Organics in Lynden, and seeks to reduce waste. The business bakes cakes and cones. Cookies for ice cream sandwiches, sauces, and toppings are made in-house. In addition to the shops, Sweet Alchemy also operates via delivery and take-out.

The interior of the University District location on Northeast 43rd Street has a fabric ceiling, penny flooring, and artworks created by the owner. Tori Shao painted a mural between the shop and neighboring Samir's Mediterranean. The Ballard location shared a space and seating area with Mighty-O Donuts, which has also operated multiple locations in the Seattle area. The interior had a waffle cone mural made from the glass of Japanese fishing boats found along the Pacific Northwest coastline.

=== Menu ===
In addition to ice cream, the menu includes kombucha and nitro cold brew floats as well as desserts commemorating holidays, such as pink strawberry-flavored waffle cones and a Sweetheart Sundae with a brownie, red wine caramel, whipped cream, and a cherry, for Valentine's Day in 2020.

Ice cream varieties have included: birthday cake, cookies and cream, banana Nutella crunch, lemon custard, London fog (Earl Grey tea and vanilla), kettle corn, salted caramel, smoked chocolate, sweet cream, masala chai, toasted black sesame, cherry blossom, makgeolli (Korean rice wine), Persian Rose with cardamom, pistachio, and rosewater. The flavor DarkSide has a Valrhona dutch base, Oreo-like cookies, and chocolate ganache. The Jitter Bars has caramel and homemade espresso shortbread. The Neapolitan has Mighty-O's chocolate doughnuts, strawberry compote, and organic vanilla coconut cream. Coconut cream is used for other non-dairy flavors. Among vegan varieties is a Blueberry Lavender flavor. To commemorate the opening of the U District station in 2021, Sweet Alchemy served and purple-and-gold-colored ice cream with blueberry lavender and honey.

== History ==
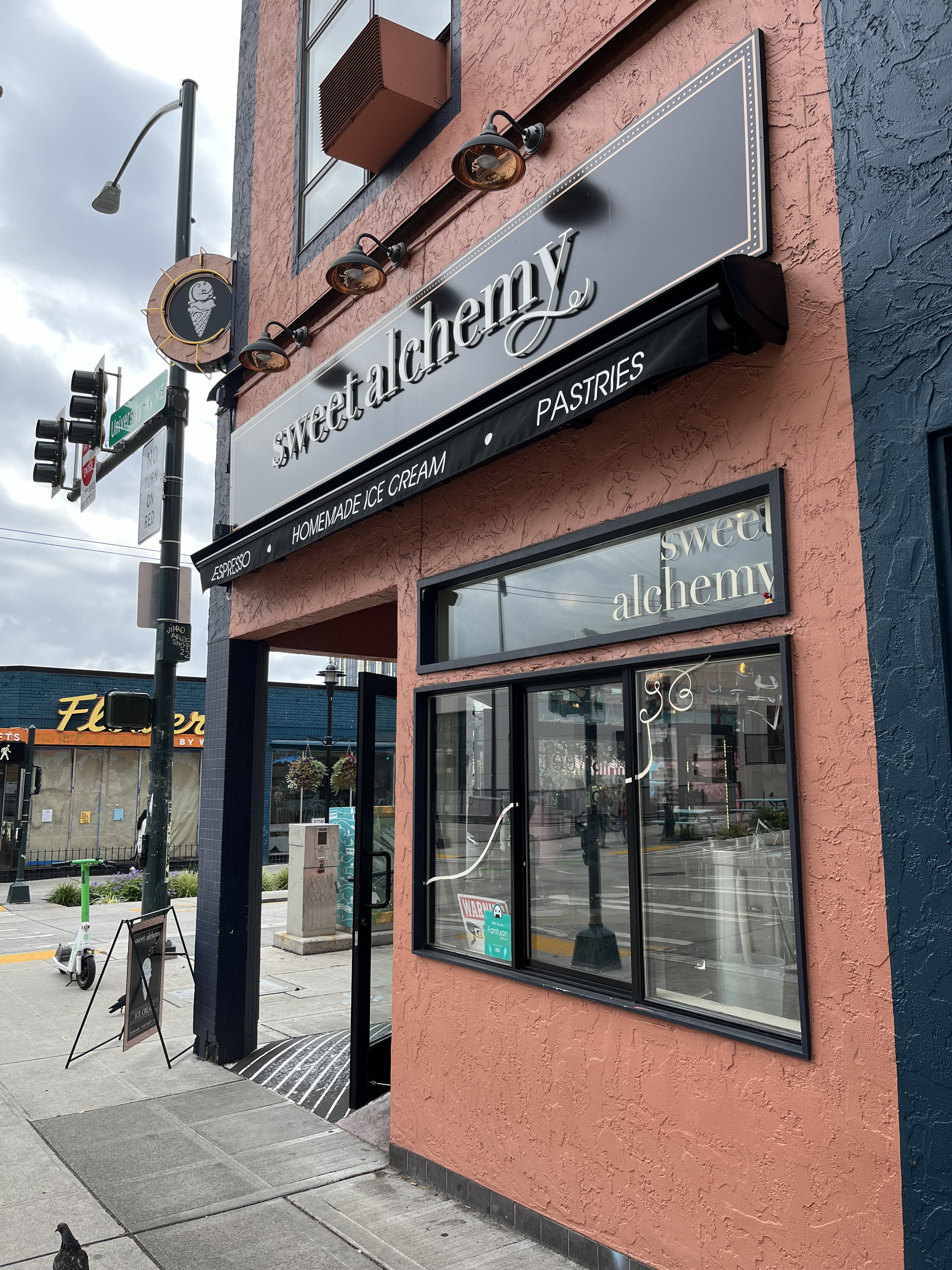
Exterior of the shop in the University District, 2024

Owner Lois Ko, who attended the University of Washington (UW), opened her first shop near the campus in 2016. The shop operates in the same space where she had worked as a student at another ice cream shop. According to KING-TV, all ingredients are made in-house and ice cream is produced with a vat pasteurizer at the University District shop. Ko opened a second location in Ballard in 2019, with a grand opening held on April 10. She and Mighty-O owner Ryan Kellner met at UW. A third location opened on Capitol Hill in February 2020. The outpost replaced Kurt Farm Shop, which closed in late 2019.

Like many businesses, Sweet Alchemy operated via delivery at times during the COVID-19 pandemic. In 2020, the business launched a series of "pun-driven" ice cream flavors, with proceeds benefiting nonprofit organizations working for racial justice. Flavors created in collaboration with BIPOC-owned businesses in the metropolitan area included: Brew the Right Thing (Fulcrum Coffee ice cream with Jerk Shack coconut caramel); Vegan Do This Together, described as a "lemon blended vegan coconut concoction" with Off the Rez jam and Pot Pie Factory vegan pie crust; and History in the Baking, which used Salvadorean Bakery cookies. Sales raised money for BLOC, Chief Seattle Club, Northwest Immigrant Rights Project, and the Urban League of Metropolitan Seattle. Sweet Alchemy was among 40 restaurants participating in the Cherry Blossom Festival organized by the U District Partnership in 2022. Ko was on the U District Partnership's board at the time.

== Reception ==
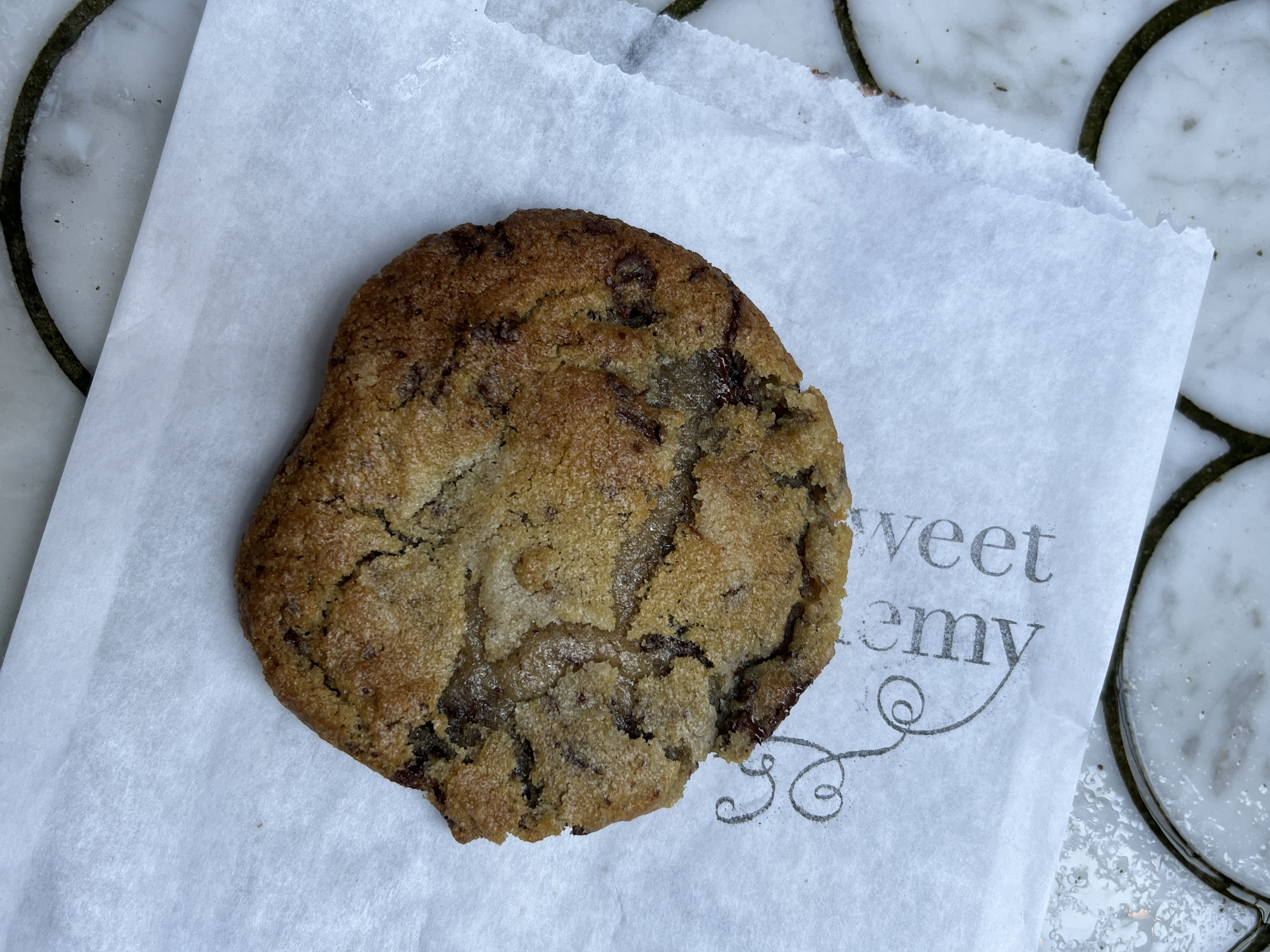
Chocolate chip cookie on a branded wrapper

Caroline Choe of Today ranked Sweet Alchemy number 35 in a 2021 list of the 41 best ice cream shops and frozen dessert brands in the United States. The Infatuation's Aimee Rizzo recommended the Jitter Bars and opined, "If there were ice cream shops as good as Sweet Alchemy near every college campus, nobody would graduate." She also included the business in the website's 2023 overview of Seattle's best ice cream shops. Sweet Alchemy was also included in The Infatuation's 2025 list of the best restaurants and bars in the University District.

Bradley Foster and Emma Banks listed Sweet Alchemy in Thrillist's 2022 overview of the city's fifteen best ice cream shops. In 2023, Sweet Alchemy was included in Eater Seattle's summary of "great" eateries for ice cream and gelato in the city, Seattle Child's list of six local "must-go" ice cream shops, and Seattle Metropolitan's overview of the city's best ice cream.

== See also ==
- List of ice cream parlor chains
- List of restaurant chains in the United States
