= Mighty-O Donuts =

American café chain

Coordinates: 47.61701°N 122.33221°W

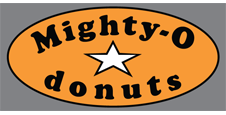
- Type: Private, doughnut cafe
- Founded: Seattle, Washington, US (May 2000; 26 years ago)
- Founder: Ryan Kellner
- Headquarters: Seattle, Washington, United States
- Number of locations: 5 cafes and 1 production facility (2022)
- Website: mightyo.com

Mighty-O Donuts is a chain of donut cafe restaurants and a donut wholesaler in Seattle, Washington, founded in 2000. Their donuts and toppings are made in Seattle from scratch using organic, 100% Plant-Based NON-GMO ingredients. The product contains no artificial colors, no dyes, no additives, and no preservatives. The chain bakes and sells donuts at four locations in the area. Mighty-O sells various to-go coffee items, coffee bean blends, and merchandise (such as mugs, hoodies, etc).

== Locations ==
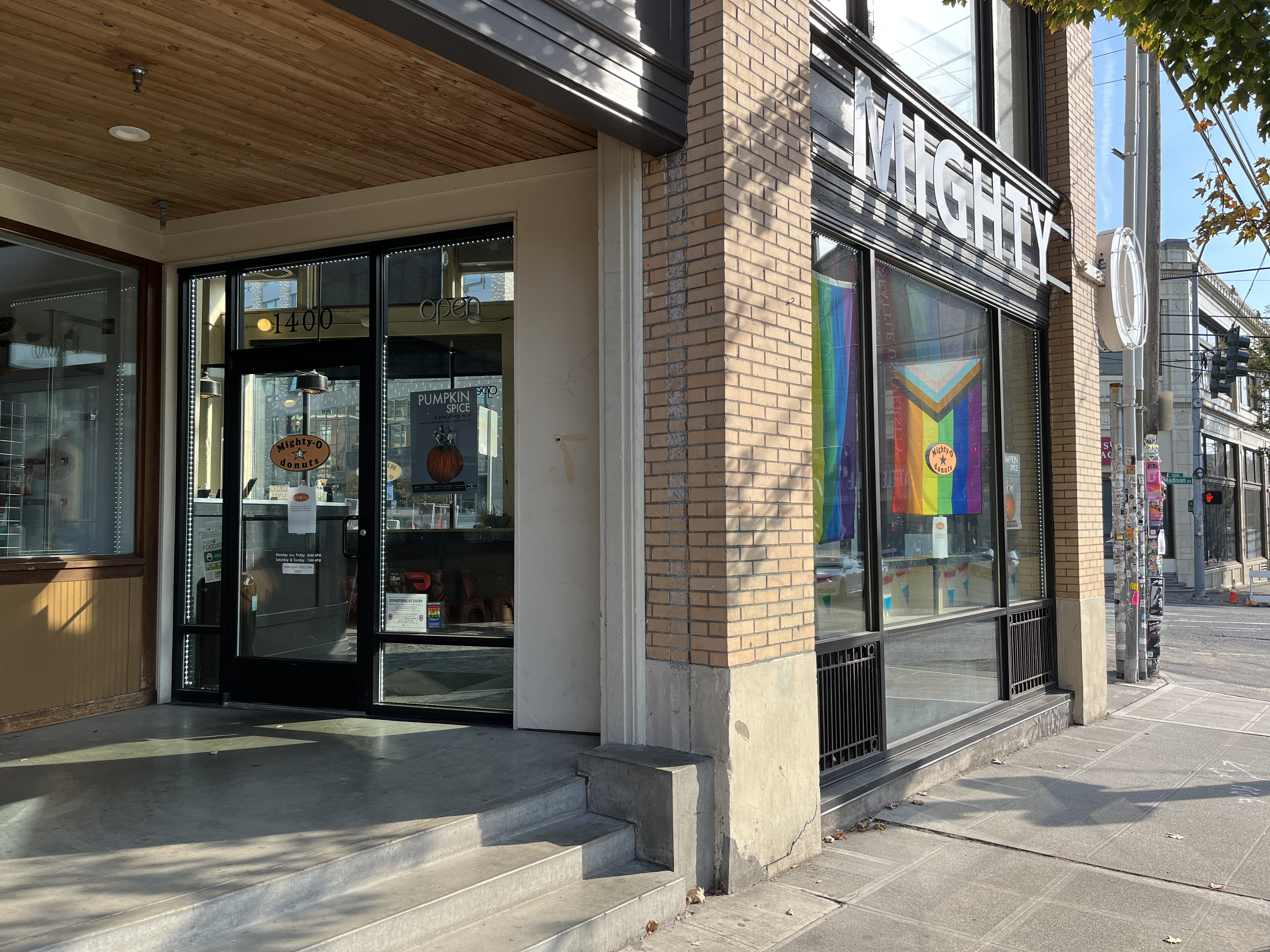
Exterior of a shop in Seattle, 2022

As of January 2025, Mighty-O Donuts has four locations in the greater Seattle area. The first cafe is located in the Keystone Building in Tangletown, part of Seattle's Wallingford neighborhood, and was opened in 2003. Locations in Ballard and Capitol Hill were added in 2015. There is also a location in Green Lake. The most recent location was opened in 2018 and is located on 2nd & Madison in Seattle. Mighty-O gives tours of their facilities to the public, which range from tours booked by schools to family tours. The company is in the works of replacing a parking spot with a park-let in front of their Ballard location.

== Founding ==
The company was founded in May 2000 at a street fair in the University District of Seattle, Washington, by Ryan Kellner. Before opening up their first store front, Mighty-O Donuts began as a vendor at local Seattle street fairs and farmers markets, and sold their first donut at the University District Street Fair in 2000. In 2001, the company set up their first kitchen and began making wholesale donut deliveries in the Seattle area. Mighty-O was founded based on the core values of providing the community with organic, non-GMO, vegan, affordable, and sustainable donuts.

== Community involvement ==
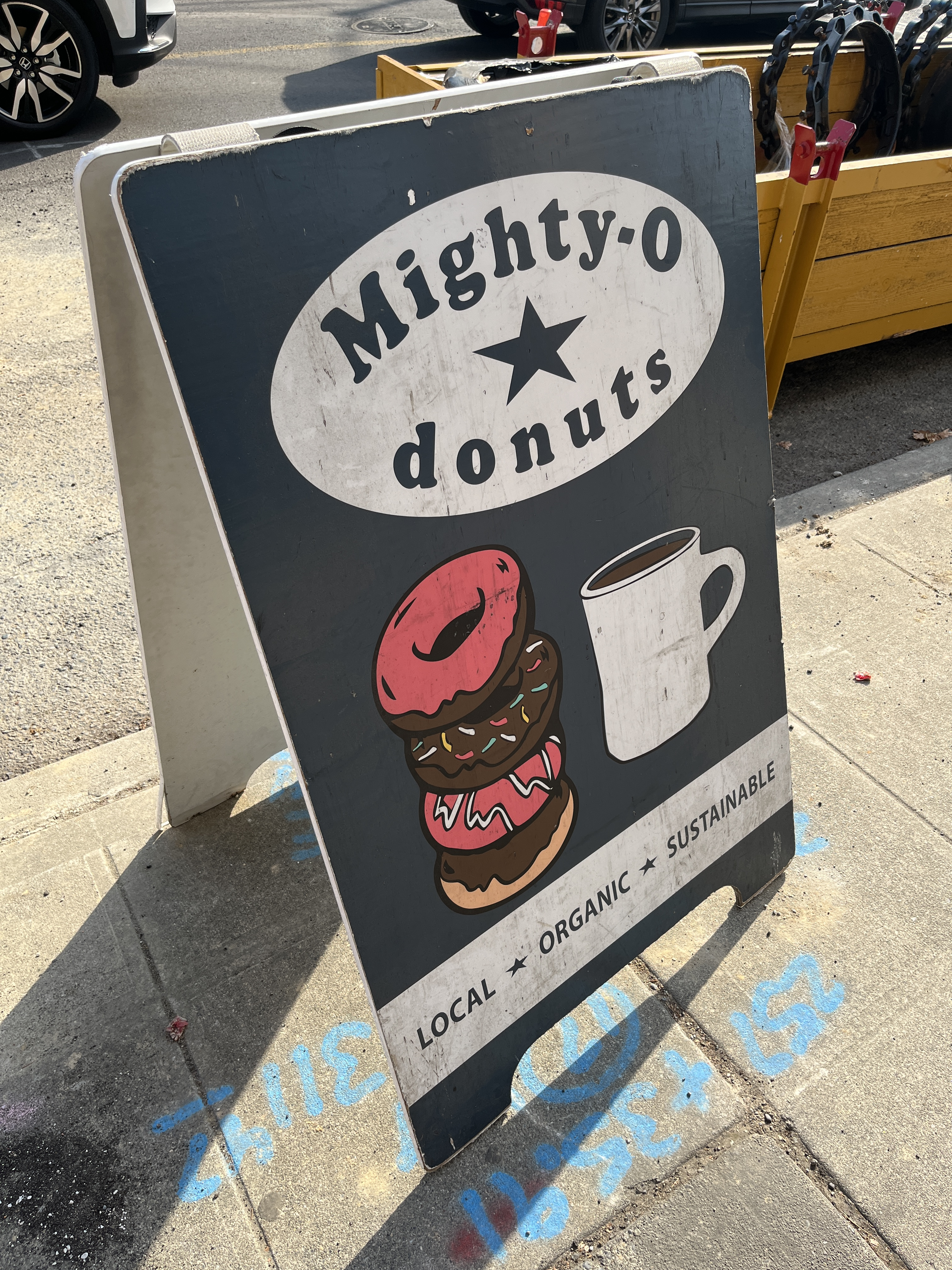
Sign, 2022

The company donates some of its earnings to educational and non-profit organizations. In addition, Mighty-O's work to strengthen the Seattle community is demonstrated through its participation in Bicycle Benefits and donating all excess unsold donuts to area hospitals, food pantries and non-profit events. One of their missions is to give back to the community by feeding the hungry. Their website brings awareness to hunger, specifically in Washington State, and highlights ways that the company works to combat this. Mighty-O works with local non-profit community outreach programs, including Operation Sack Lunch, to help combat hunger by donating their donuts to them. Mighty-O holds progressive values, and has shown support for social justice movements, including Black Lives Matter and the LGBTQ+ community. Their support has been shown through their social media pages, company website, and donations to several causes. As a company, they have also called attention to the COVID-19 pandemic, and made efforts to ensure the safety of their employees and customers. Mighty-O sells a Covid-Relief Blend Coffee called 'We Got This Seattle' available at their Green Lake, Ballard, and Capitol Hill locations, and donates $2 from every bag sold to Seattle Foundation's COVID-19 Response Fund. Their website features several feed posts that highlight the importance of earth-friendly practices, with the goal of educating their audiences on how to be more sustainable. These posts include ways that people can engage in sustainable practices at home, as well as highlight ways that the company works to reduce their carbon footprint. In 2019, 5 years after the deadly 2014 mudslide near Oso, Washington, Mighty-O donated $4,000 to help build the Oso Landslide Memorial.

== Recognition ==
In 2010 the food magazine Bon Appétit named Mighty-O one of the ten best donut shops in the United States. It also received a $10,000 prize for the best donuts in the televised Food Network Challenge: Donut Champions, filmed in November 2010. In 2014, PETA named Mighty-O the best vegan-friendly donut shop in the US
