= Mount Misch =

Mountain in Washington (state), United States

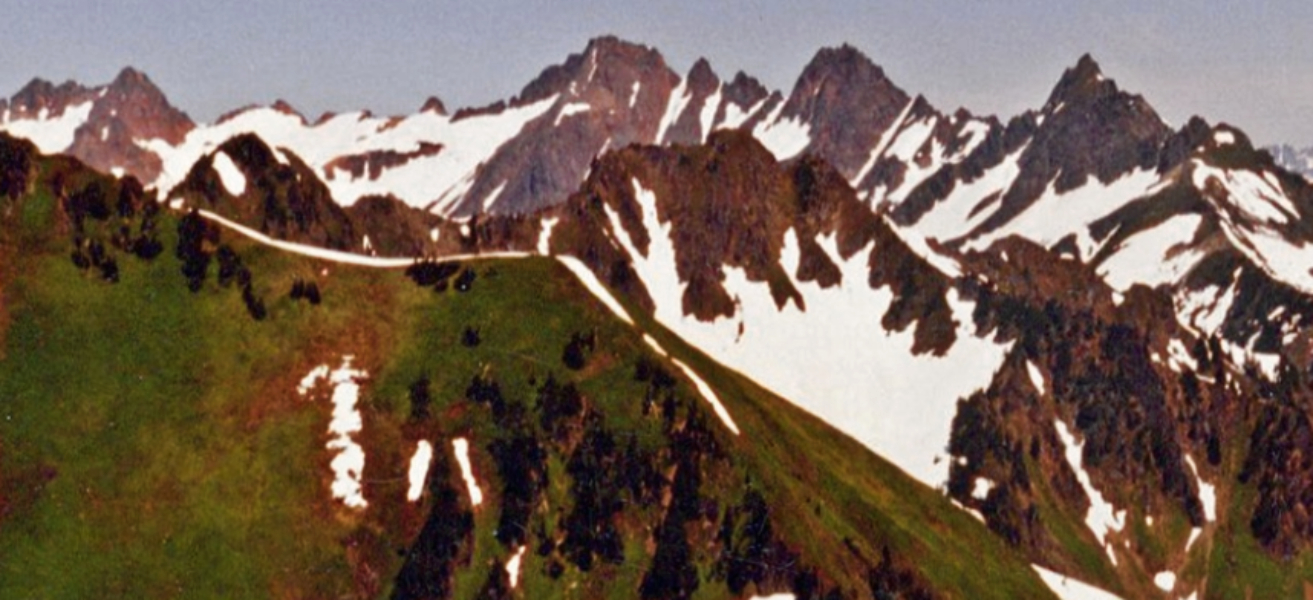
- Mount Misch (highest point centered) seen from Green Mountain

Highest point
- Elevation: 7,435 ft (2,266 m)
- Prominence: 2,435 ft (742 m)
- Parent peak: Sentinel Peak (8,266 ft)
- Isolation: 5.49 mi (8.84 km)
- Coordinates: 48°20′37″N 121°12′00″W

Geography
- Location within Washington (state) Location within the United States
- Interactive map of
- Country: United States
- State: Washington
- County: Skagit
- Protected area: Glacier Peak Wilderness
- Parent range: Cascade Range
- Topo map: USGS Downey Mountain

Geology
- Rock type: mineralized Breccia pipe

Climbing
- First ascent: August 28, 1955 D. Grimlund, D. Nicholson, and W. Trueblood
- Easiest route: Mountaineering

Mount Misch is a remote 7,435 ft mountain summit in the North Cascades, in Skagit County of Washington state. It is the highest point of the Buckindy Range, or Buckindy Ridge. It is located 19 miles east-northeast of Darrington, Washington, and 15 miles north-northwest of Glacier Peak which is one of the Cascade stratovolcanoes. It is situated in the Glacier Peak Wilderness on land administered by the Mount Baker-Snoqualmie National Forest. Mount Misch was named by mountaineer and author Fred Beckey for his friend Peter Misch (1909-1987), University of Washington geology professor and mountaineer, who was renowned for his study of the North Cascades. Precipitation runoff from Mount Misch and the unnamed Goat Creek glacier on its east slope drains into tributaries of the Suiattle River and ultimately the Skagit River.

== Climate ==
Mount Misch is located in the marine west coast climate zone of western North America. Most weather fronts coming off the Pacific Ocean travel northeast toward the Cascade Mountains. As fronts approach the North Cascades, they are forced upward by the peaks of the Cascade Range (orographic lift), causing them to drop their moisture in the form of rain or snowfall onto the Cascades. As a result, the west side of the North Cascades experiences high precipitation, especially during the winter months in the form of snowfall. During winter months, weather is usually cloudy, but, due to high pressure systems over the Pacific Ocean that intensify during summer months, there is often little or no cloud cover during the summer.

== Geology ==
The North Cascades features some of the most rugged topography in the Cascade Range with craggy peaks, ridges, and deep glacial valleys. Geological events occurring many years ago created the diverse topography and drastic elevation changes over the Cascade Range leading to the various climate differences. These climate differences lead to vegetation variety defining the ecoregions in this area.

The history of the formation of the Cascade Mountains dates back millions of years ago to the late Eocene Epoch. With the North American Plate overriding the Pacific Plate, episodes of volcanic igneous activity persisted. In addition, small fragments of the oceanic and continental lithosphere called terranes created the North Cascades about 50 million years ago.

During the Pleistocene period dating back over two million years ago, glaciation advancing and retreating repeatedly scoured the landscape leaving deposits of rock debris. The U-shaped cross section of the river valleys is a result of recent glaciation. Uplift and faulting in combination with glaciation have been the dominant processes which have created the tall peaks and deep valleys of the North Cascades area. The rusty reddish color of Mount Misch and the Buckindy Range is due to mineralized breccia pipe.

== Gallery ==
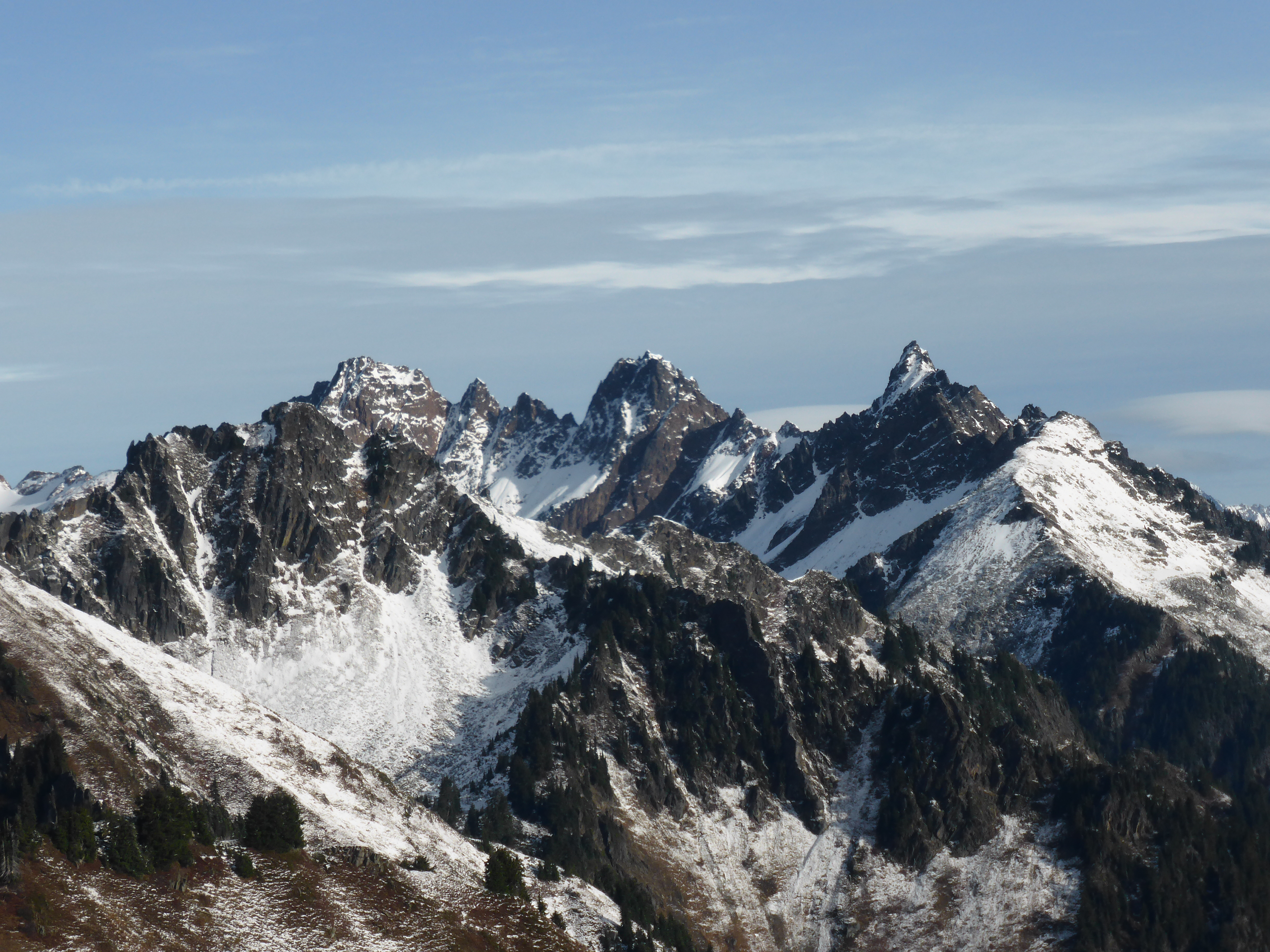
Mount Misch from Green Mountain

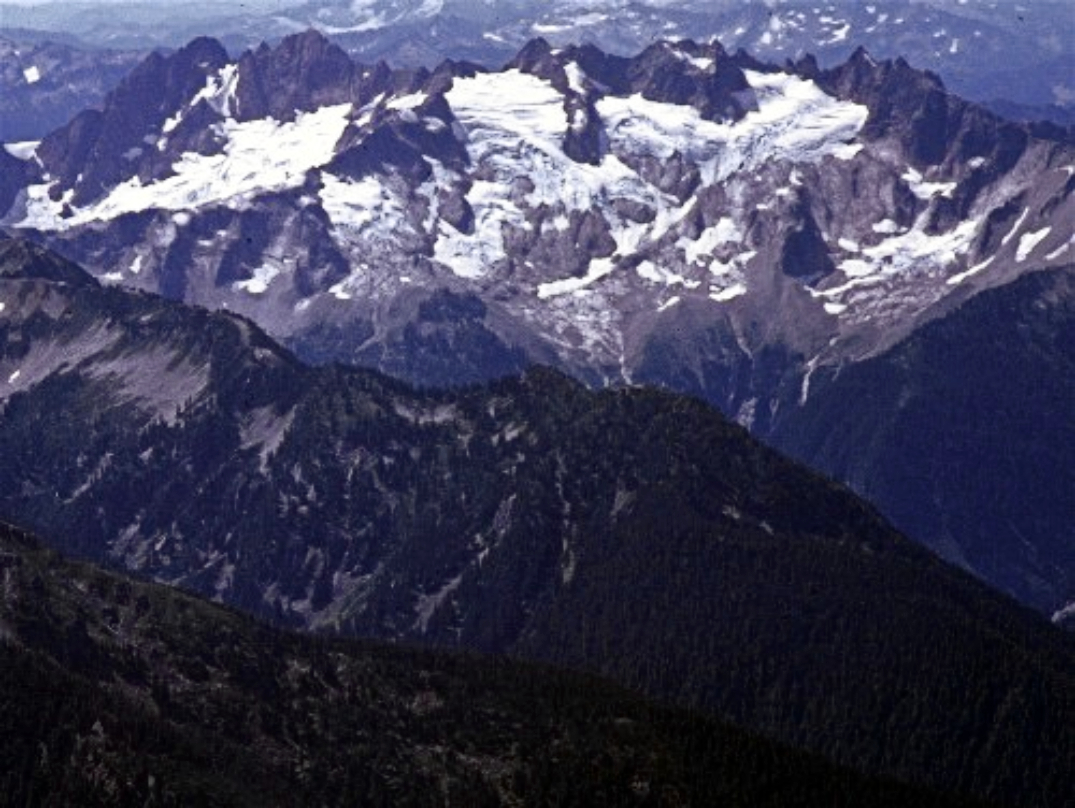
The Buckindy Range seen from Eldorado Peak with Mount Misch the highest peak on left side

== See also ==
- Misch Crag
- Geology of the Pacific Northwest
- Geography of the North Cascades
- Mount Buckindy
