= 2014 Oso landslide =

Landslide east of Oso, Washington, United States

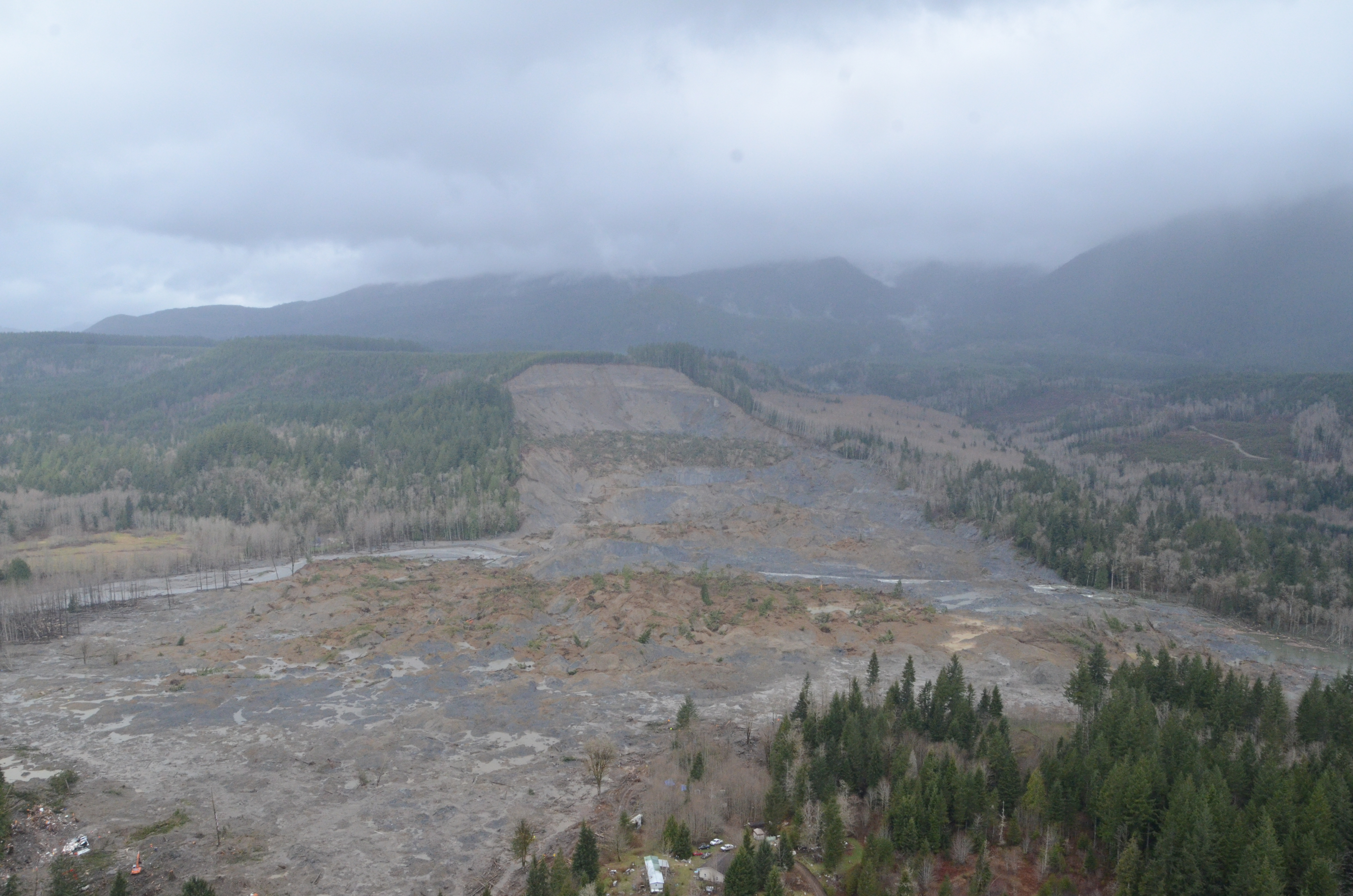
- Oso Mudslide on March 29, 2014, view to the northeast
- Date: March 22, 2014
- Time: 10:36 a.m.
- Location: Oso, Washington; 48°16′57″N 121°50′53″W
- Cause: Suspected soil saturation from heavy rainfall
- Deaths: 43
- Injuries: 12 total (4 serious)
- Missing: 0
- Property damage: $60 million (2014 USD)

A major landslide occurred 4 miles (6.4 km) east of Oso, Washington, United States, on March 22, 2014, at 10:37 a.m. local time. A portion of an unstable hill collapsed, sending mud and debris to the south across the North Fork of the Stillaguamish River, engulfing a rural neighborhood, and covering an area of approximately 1 square mile (2.6 km^{2}). Forty-three people were killed and 49 homes and other structures destroyed. The landslide has been described as one of, if not the most, deadly landslide in American history.

== Overview ==
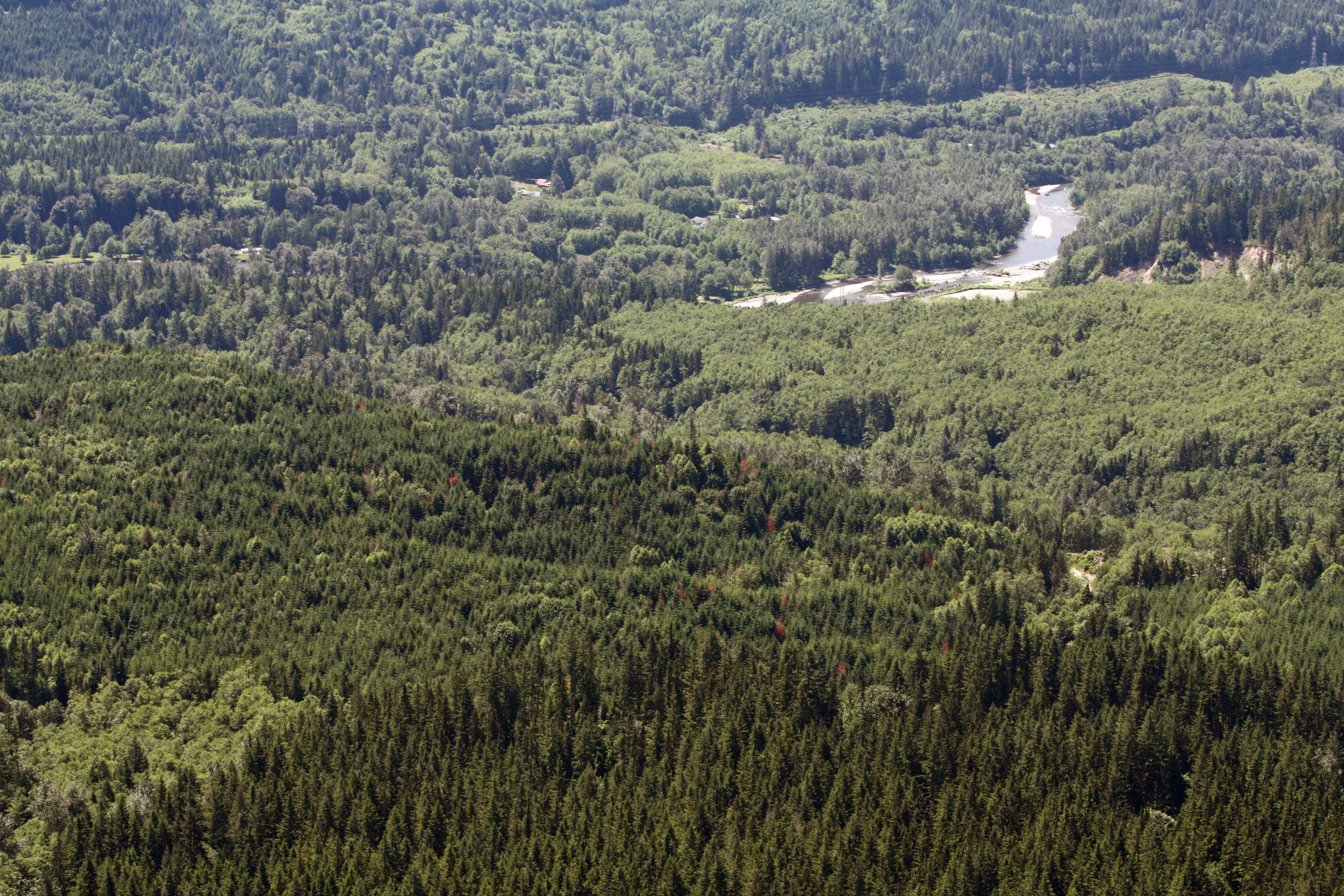
2009 view to the southwest overlooking the slide site (on the left) and the Steelhead Haven plat across the Stillaguamish River. The unstable area is the area of lighter green trees to the right and beneath the river section that is visible. The mudslide flowed towards the upper left, across the river. All of the houses visible in the image were destroyed.

The March 2014 landslide engulfed 49 homes and other structures in an unincorporated neighborhood known as "Steelhead Haven" on the south side of the North Fork of the Stillaguamish River, approximately 4 miles (6.4 km) east of Oso, Washington. It also dammed the river, causing extensive flooding upstream as well as blocking State Route 530, the main route to the town of Darrington (population 1,347), 16 miles (26 km) east of Oso.

The natural rock and mineral formation (referred to as a "geological feature") with the most recent activity in the area of Oso is known as the Hazel Landslide; the most recent landslide event was referred to in the media as "The Oso Mudslide". Excluding landslides caused by volcanic eruptions, earthquakes or dam collapses, the Oso slide is the deadliest single landslide event in United States history.

The Hazel Landslide has a history of instability dating to 1937. Prior to the March 2014 mudslide, the Oso area had heavy rainfall during the previous 45 days, up to 200 percent of normal. The slide, described by witnesses as a "fast-moving wall of mud", contained trees and other debris; it cut through homes directly beneath the hill on the south side of the Stillaguamish River. A firefighter at the scene stated, "When the slide hit the river, it was like a tsunami." A Washington state geologist stated the slide was one of the largest landslides he had personally seen. The mud, soil and rock debris left from the mudslide covered an area 1,500 ft (460 m) long, 4,400 ft (1,300 m) wide and deposited debris 30 to 70 ft (9.1 to 21.3 m) deep. A national geologist stated the flow of the landslide was extreme because of the extraordinary run-out of mud and debris. While the landslide was well documented, a research team from the Geotechnical Extreme Events Reconnaissance (GEER) announced in April 2014 that it would investigate the factors contributing to the slide.

== Casualties and damage ==
More than 100 first responders from Snohomish County Volunteer Search and Rescue (SCVSAR), Snohomish County, and other surrounding counties were dispatched to assist with emergency medical and search-and-rescue efforts, including the Navy's search and rescue unit stationed at nearby Naval Air Station Whidbey Island. Over 600 personnel, including more than 160 volunteers, worked on landslide recovery operations.

Late in the evening of March 22, 2014, Washington's Lieutenant Governor Brad Owen declared a state of emergency in Snohomish County. Washington state Governor Jay Inslee toured the area by air the following day before joining county officials at a news conference.

On the day of the slide, eight people were rescued and taken to regional hospitals. While the official search for victims ended in April 2014, workers and volunteers continued to screen debris and look for one victim still unaccounted for. On July 22, 2014 the Snohomish County Sheriff's Office confirmed 43 fatalities after remains of the final victim had been located and identified.

The slide blocked the North Fork of the Stillaguamish River, causing it to back up eastward. Because of concerns that the mud and debris dam could fail and cause downstream flooding, the National Weather Service (NWS) issued a flash flood watch. On April 2, 2014, with the river flowing in a new channel at the north end of the debris dam, the service lifted the flash flood watch. Flooding due to the partially obstructed river continued to occur upstream of the debris dam. As a result, the NWS continued to issue flood warnings for the Stillaguamish one month after the March 2014 slide.

State Route 530 was indefinitely closed after the slide by the Washington State Department of Transportation (WSDOT), with an alternative local route opened the following week after snow was cleared from the unpaved portion of Mountain Loop Highway south of Darrington. The highway was cleared enough by May 31 to open one lane of escorted traffic. Because the highway was badly damaged, and because the topography of the area had been altered by the landslide, WSDOT decided to elevate that section of the highway when it was rebuilt. The new roadway was opened September 22, ahead of schedule of the projected completion date of early October 2014.

== Federal aid ==
On April 3, the mudslide was declared a major disaster by President Barack Obama. The declaration was requested on April 1 by Governor Inslee, who stated that approximately 30 families needed help with housing and other needs. Inslee said that financial loss estimates had reached $10 million. Snohomish County Emergency Management Director John Pennington advised residents to register with FEMA. Four days later, during passage of the Green Mountain Lookout Heritage Protection Act, Senator Patty Murray (D-WA) mentioned the landslide, saying the bill would "provide a glimmer of hope for the long-term recovery of this area."

On April 22, President Obama visited the west side of the slide area. After arriving in Air Force One at Paine Field in Everett, he met with officials and boarded Marine One. There, he was joined by Governor Inslee and Senators Patty Murray and Maria Cantwell as well as Rep. Suzan DelBene for a flyover of the slide and debris field. After viewing the site, the president met privately with survivors, families of the victims, and some of the scene's first responders and rescuers at the Oso fire hall.

== Controversy ==
=== "Completely unforeseen" remark ===
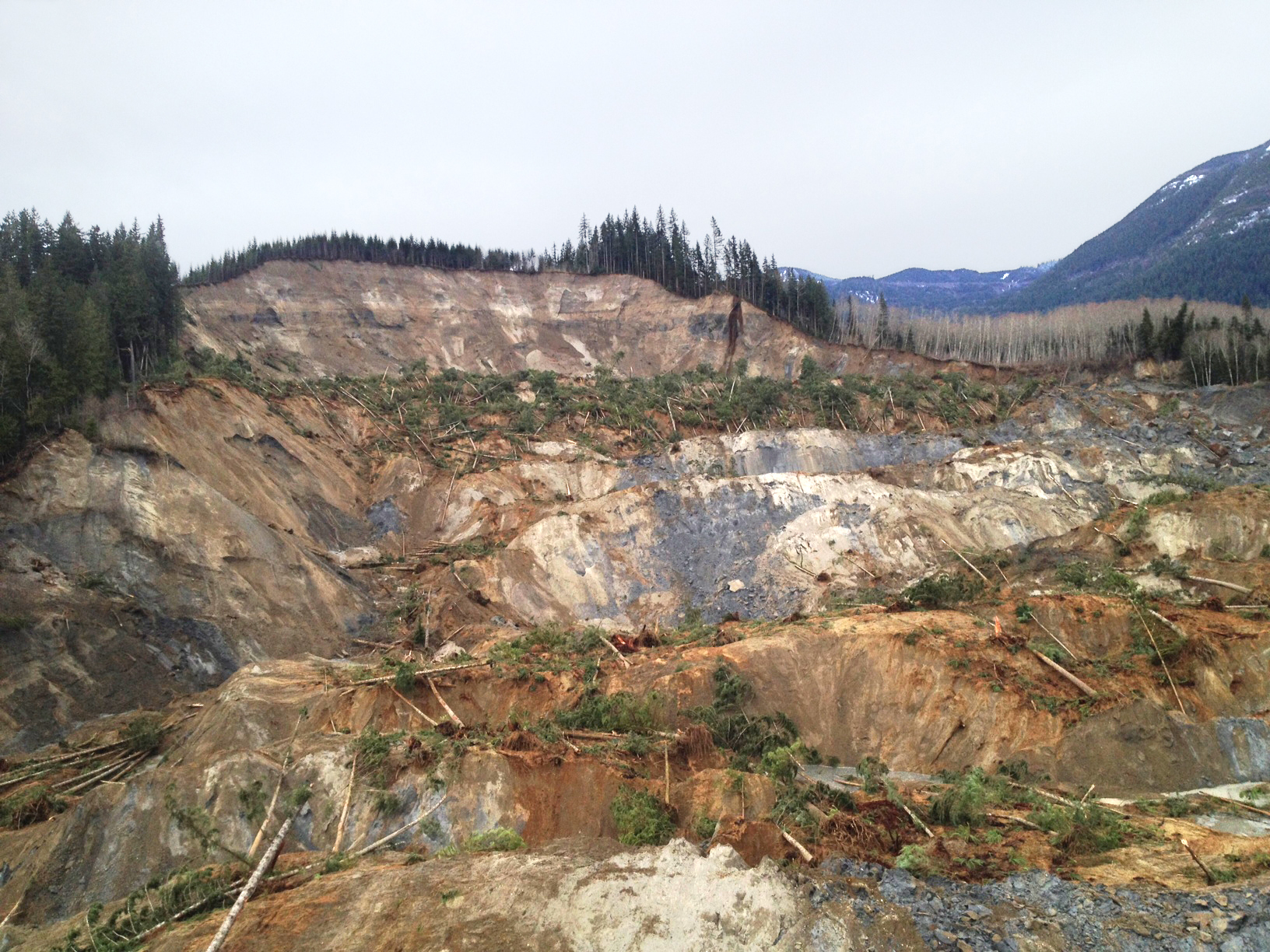
Top view of slide area

On March 24, two days after the slide, John Pennington, Director of Snohomish County's Department of Emergency Management, stated at a news conference, "This was a completely unforeseen slide. This came out of nowhere." The same day The Seattle Times published an article about previous slides at the same location, as well as the likelihood of future slides. The article contained comments from geologists, engineers, and local residents, and stated that the area was known among locals as "Slide Hill". On the next day, The Times followed up with a full page article, "'Unforeseen' risk of slide? Warnings go back decades". Snohomish County Public Works Director Steve Thomsen was quoted as saying, "A slide of this magnitude is very difficult to predict. There was no indication, no indication at all."

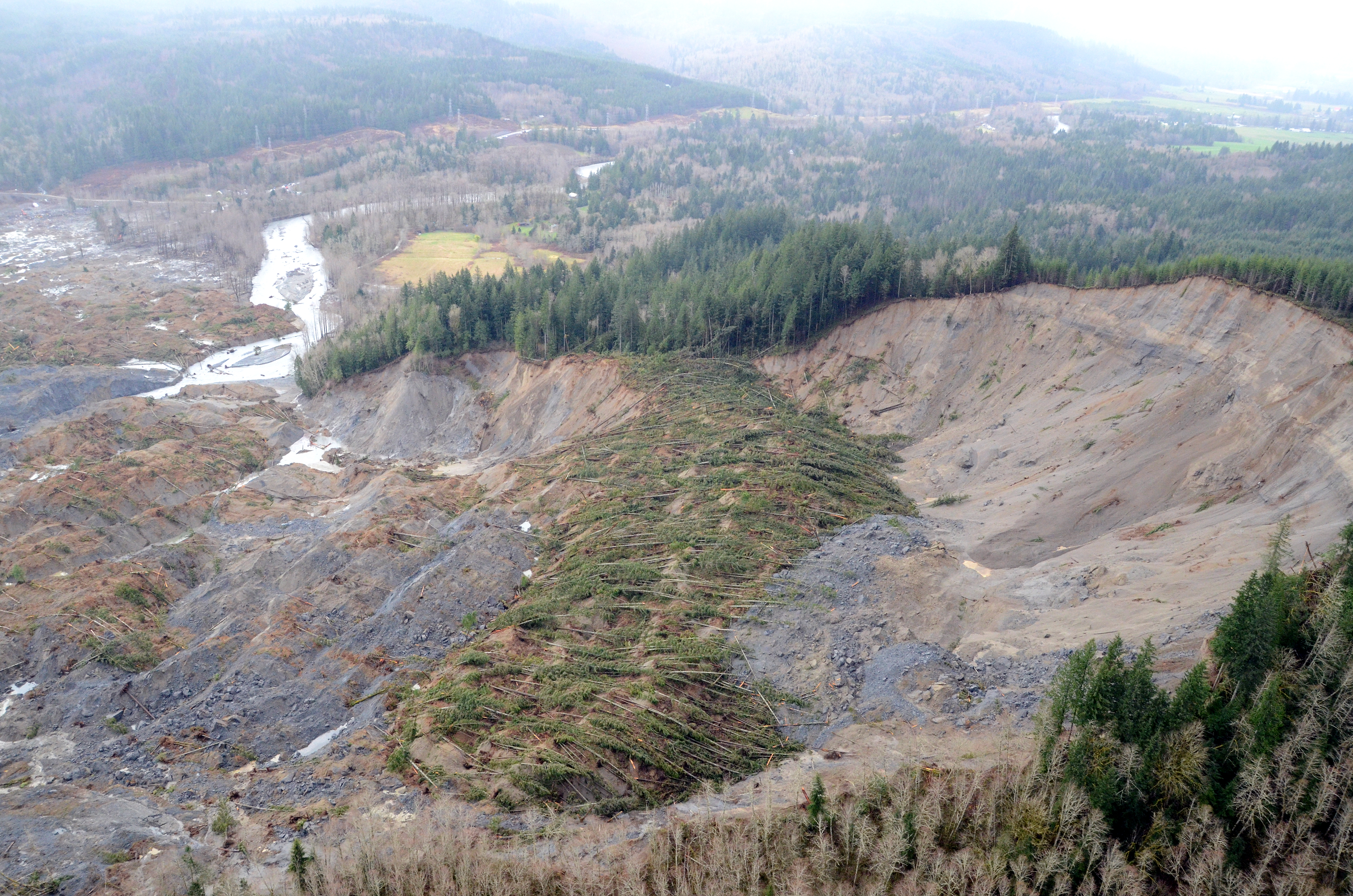
Aerial view of slide ridge

On March 27, 2014, The Seattle Times reported that a 2010 study, commissioned by the county, warned the hillside above Steelhead Drive was one of the most dangerous in the county. According to Rob Flaner, one of the authors of the 2010 report, "For someone to say that this plan did not warn that this was a risk is a falsity." In the days following the slide, criticism of Snohomish County officials received national attention in a New York Times editorial. The Seattle Times further reported that in 2004, county officials became concerned about the possibility of a dangerous landslide in the Steelhead Haven area, and considered buying out the homes of that area's residents. The idea was rejected with the county building a new wall in an attempt to stabilize the slope. Some disaster experts criticized this decision as a serious mistake. According to environmental engineer and applied geomorphologist Tracy Drury, "[after the 2006 slide they] didn't even stop pounding nails." As to any kind of buy-out program, Drury further stated, "I think we did the best we could under the constraints that nobody wanted to sell their property and move elsewhere."

Repairs to the slide area extend back several decades prior to the March 2014 slide. A rock revetment installed in 1962 to protect the toe of the slide area from erosion from the river was overrun by a slide two years later. An effort in 2006 to move the river 430 feet (130 m) south of the erosion area failed when another landslide moved the river a total of 730 feet (220 m).

=== Logging ===
In the days following the slide, scientists questioned whether logging in the area could have been a factor contributing to the hillside collapse. Grandy Lake Forest Associates of Mount Vernon, Washington proposed a 15-acre (6 ha) clearcut at the upper edge of the Oso landslide zone in 2004. Washington state forester Aaron Everett stated in an interview with KUOW that the application was rejected and "The one that was approved in the end eliminated the part of the harvest that would have been inside the groundwater recharge area." Everett further stated the resulting 7-acre (2.8 ha) clearcut operation reached to the edge of the groundwater danger zone. An investigation is being conducted to determine whether Grandy Lake crossed into the restricted area that could theoretically feed groundwater into the landslide zone, affecting it for 16 to 27 years.

== Aftermath ==
Two years after the mudslide, about 11,000 tons of wreckage had been removed from the slide area. Thirty-four parcels of land had been purchased by Snohomish County from owners of property too dangerous for residences. Properties in the area bordering State Route 530 and across from the slide area remained salable.

In October 2016, survivors and the victims' families reached settlements with the State of Washington and a timber company, Grandy Lake Forest Associates, for $50 million and $10 million respectively.

== Site memorials ==
Alongside State Route 530, the entrance to what was Steelhead Drive is closed by a gate that was decorated by impromptu memorials. Alongside, three rows of 43 cedar trees were planted, one for each of the victims. At the time of the planting, each tree was decorated with mementos specific to each person.

In September 2017, one of the few trees in the path of the slide that remained standing near Highway 530 and was seen by locals as a memorial was cut down as a danger tree. County officials decided to cut the Sitka spruce tree down after it was determined its roots had sustained enough damage that it could no longer be considered stable and not a hazard to both the Whitehorse Trail parallel to the highway as well as the highway itself. Following the slide, a memorial sign carved out of cedar and reading, "Oso. 10:45 a.m. 3/22/14", was placed on the spruce and remained until the tree was removed. The Snohomish County Department of Parks, Recreation & Tourism announced on March 22, 2018, that plans had begun for the Oso Landslide Memorial, a permanent memorial commemorating the victims. The tribute is set to be built at the location of the slide and fundraising efforts are underway with wood from the formerly standing memorial tree to be repurposed and used for the permanent display.

== Ground activity surrounding the slide ==
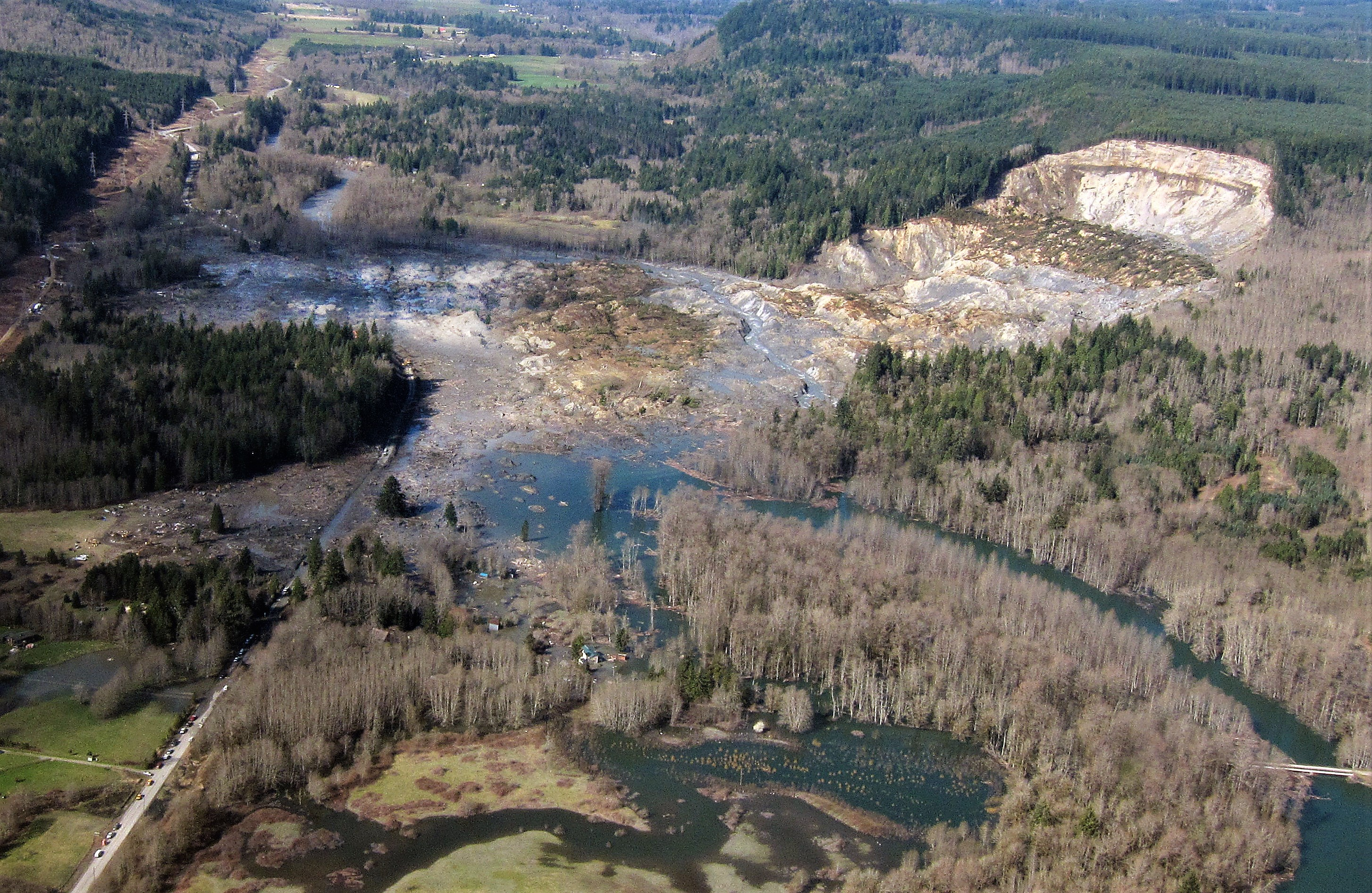
Aerial view of the damage

Ground vibrations generated by the Oso landslide were recorded at several regional stations and subsequently analyzed by the Pacific Northwest Seismic Network (PNSN). The initial collapse began at 10:37:22 a.m. local time (PDT; 17:37:22 UTC), lasting approximately 2.5 minutes. Debris loosened by initial collapse is believed to contain material previously disturbed and weakened by the 2006 slide. Following the initial event was another large slide occurring at 10:41:53 PDT.

Additional events, most likely smaller landslides breaking off the head scarp, continued for several hours. The last notable signal came at 14:10:15. Examination of records from the nearest seismic station 7 mi (11 km) to the southwest indicate small seismic events started around 8 a.m. the day of the slide and stopped in the late afternoon. However, they were not detected at the next nearest seismic station. They are also seen in the days before and after the slide, but only during daylight hours. They are believed to be related to some kind of human activity. No other indications of possible precursors have been found.

In the days following the slide, Snohomish County Emergency Management Director John Pennington speculated a 1.1 magnitude earthquake on March 10 may have triggered the landslide. Data collected by the PNSN shows a magnitude 1.1 earthquake on that date in the vicinity of the Oso landslide (about 2 ±0.8 km to the northeast), at a depth of 3.9 ±1.9 km. Regardless, the United States Geological Survey (USGS) determined the slide was not caused by seismic activity.

== Geological context ==
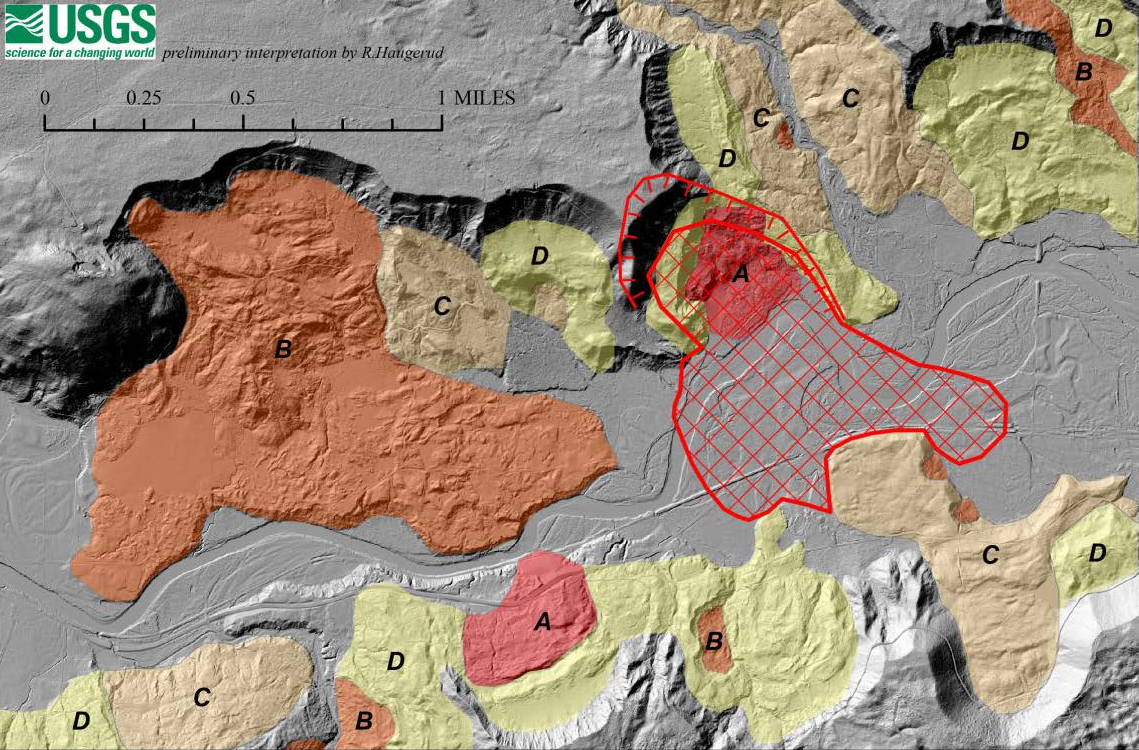
Shaded-relief geomorphologic map of Oso Landslide of 2014 and adjacent areas. Oso is two miles west of this map, Hazel, one mile east. Colored areas are older landslides, "D" being the oldest. Upper "A" is the March 2014 landslide, lower "A", Skaglund Hill. Topography shown is from 2006; red line is approximate location of the current head scarp. Red cross-hatching is the runout area, now buried in mud and debris. Terrace on the upper-left is Whitman Bench. Image from USGS OFR 2014-1065.

The landslide occurred at the southeastern edge of Whitman Bench, a land terrace about 800 ft (240 m) above the valley floor and consisting of gravel and sand deposited during the most recent glaciation. When the Puget Lobe of the Cordilleran Ice Sheet moved south from British Columbia, Canada filling the Puget Lowland, various mountain valleys were dammed and lakes were formed. Sediment washed down from the higher mountains settled in the lake bottoms, forming a layer of clay.

As the glacial ice pressed higher against the western end of Mount Frailey, water flowing around the edge of the ice from the north was forced around the mountain, eventually pouring in through the long valley extending to the northwest and now occupied by Lake Cavanaugh. Sand and gravel carried by the flow and entering the glacial lake dropped out to form a delta, the remnant of which is now known as Whitman Bench.

Following the glacier's retreat and allowing for the lake to be released, the river carved out most of the clay and silt deposits, leaving the former delta "hanging" approximately 650 ft (200 m) above the current valley floor When the sand portion of a deposit has very little clay or "fines" to cement it together, it is structurally weak, leaving the area around it vulnerable. Such an area is also sensitive to water accumulation, increasing the internal "pore" pressure and subsequently contributing to ground failure. Water infiltrating from the surface will flow through the surface, save for contact with the less permeable clay, allowing the water to accumulate and form a zone of stability weakness.

Such variations in pore pressure and water flux are one of the primary factors leading to slope failure. In case of the area of the Stillaguamish River where the March 2014 slide occurred, erosion at the base of the slope from the river flow further contributes to slope instability. Such conditions have created an extensive series of landslide complexes on both sides of the Stillaguamish valley. Additional benches on the margin of Whitman Bench are due to deep-seated slumping of large blocks, which also creates planes of weakness for future slippage and channels for water infiltration.

== History of slide activity ==
According to a 1999 report submitted to the United States Army Corps of Engineers by geologist Daniel J. Miller, PhD:

The Hazel landslide has been active for over half a century. Thorsen (1996) noted a tight river bend impinging on the north bank with active landslides visible in 1937 aerial photographs. The next 60 years involves two periods of relatively low landslide activity, and two periods of relatively high activity, the last of which extends to this day [1999].

Known activity at this specific site includes the following:

- 1937: aerial photographs show active landslides.
- 1951: mudflow from a side channel briefly blocked the river.
- 1952: movement of large, intact blocks, leaving head scarps 70 ft (21 m) high. Later photographs show persistent activity through the next decade.
- 1967 January: slump of a large block and accompanying mud flows push the river channel about 700 ft (210 m) south. This protects the toe from erosion, activity is minor for about two decades.
- 1988 November: erosion of the toe leads to another slide, and the river is again moved south, but not as far as in 1967.
- 2006 January 25: large slide blocks the river, new channel is cut to alleviate flooding.

== See also ==
- 2006 Southern Leyte mudslide
- Debris flow
- Mudflow
- Mass wasting
- Rotational slides
