= Copper Creek, Arizona =

Ghost town in Pinal County, Arizona

- Ghost town
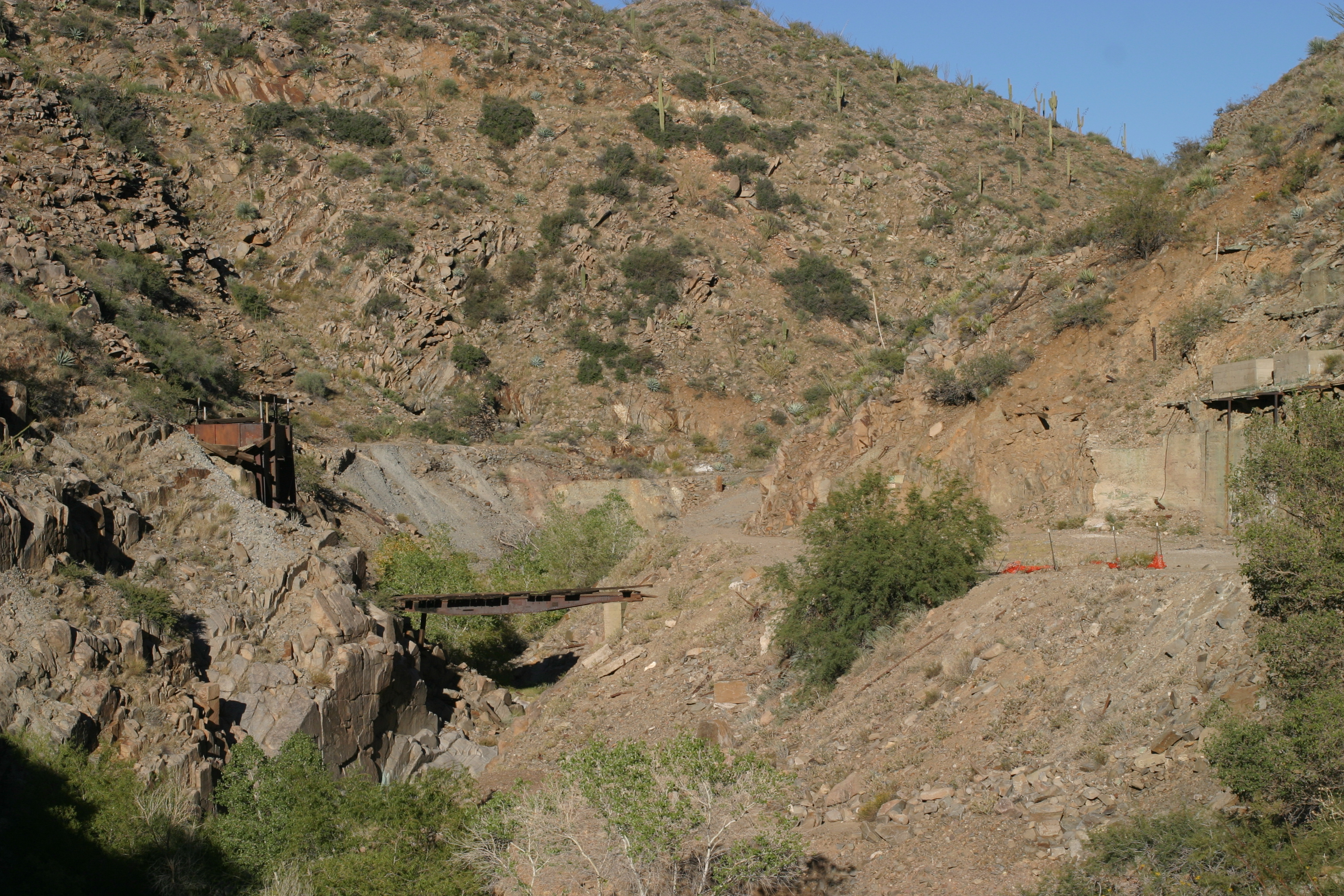
- Copper Creek Canyon

- Location within Arizona
- Coordinates: 32°45′03″N 110°28′35″W
- Country: United States
- State: Arizona
- County: Pinal
- Elevation: 3,983 ft (1,214 m)
- Time zone: UTC-7 (MST (no DST))

Copper Creek is a ghost town in Pinal County, Arizona, United States. Copper Creek is located in a canyon in the Galiuro Mountains.

== History ==
This town once had around 50 buildings. It had a peak population of approximately 500. Its post office was established on March 6, 1906, and was disestablished on August 31, 1942. A short-lived narrow-gauge railway line was built in 1913, with the locomotive and cars carried overland from the railhead at Winkelman.

Notable remains of the old town include the foundations of the post office and the shell of the Sibley Mansion.

== Geology ==
The Copper Creek mining district contains a substantial copper deposit; in recent years, several companies have proposed opening a mine there. The district hosts more than 500 mineralized breccia pipes. Buried porphyry-style, stockwork copper mineralization has attracted exploration interest in recent years.

== Geography ==
Copper Creek is about ten miles east of the community of Mammoth, via a rough dirt road.
