= Wunderground Coffee =

Coffee company based in Seattle, Washington, U.S.

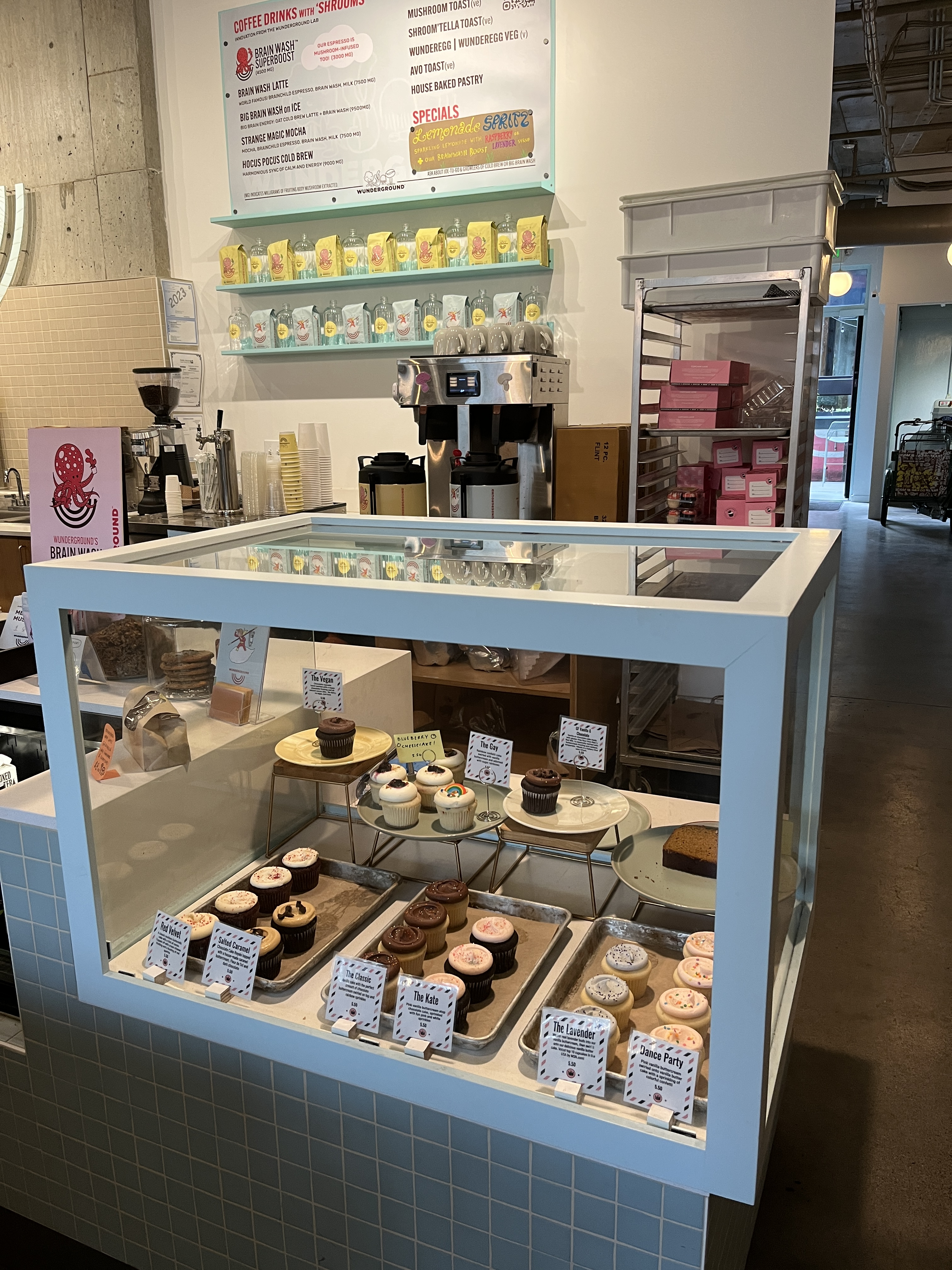
- The cafe's interior, 2023
- Interactive map of Wunderground Coffee

Restaurant information
- Established: June 2021
- Location: 1111 East Pike Street #111, Seattle, King, Washington, 98122, United States
- Coordinates: 47.6140°N 122.3176°W

Wunderground Coffee, or simply Wunderground, is a coffee company based in Seattle, in the U.S. state of Washington. Its flagship coffee shop, Wunderground Café, operates on Capitol Hill. Wunderground offers coffee drinks infused with adaptogenic mushrooms, which are not psychedelic.

== Description ==
Wunderground is a coffee company in Seattle with a flagship cafe at the intersection of 11th and East Pike Street on the southern end of Capitol Hill. One of the cafe's interior walls has a sculpture made from knitted flowers, paper, and wood. Wunderground offers coffee drinks infused with adaptogenic mushrooms. Coffee options include affogato, americano, black, café au lait, cappuccino, cortado, doppio, espresso, flat white, Irish, latte, lungo, macchiato, and ristretto. The Brain Wash is a mushroom vanilla latte and the Strange Magic is a dark chocolate mushroom mocha. Wunderground's food menu has included bone broths, bowls, and sandwiches.

The business has also operated at Seattle–Tacoma International Airport. Wunderground has pastel-colored packing.

== History ==
Founder and owner Jody Hall established Wunderground in June 2021. The company's flagship cafe on Capitol Hill, called Wunderground Cafe, opened on October 30, 2021. It is housed in a space previously occupied by Cupcake Royale, which was also founded by Hall. Ahead of the shop's opening, Wunderground was a pop-up in Chophouse Row.

In 2022, Wunderground collaborated with Salt & Straw on three new flavors. Wunderground also partnered with PCC Community Markets to launch new "certified organic coffee and mushroom blends" at the Seattle-based food cooperative.

Wunderground's menu was created by James Beard Foundation Award-winning chef Maria Hines.
