= Mount Buckindy =

Mountain in Washington (state), United States

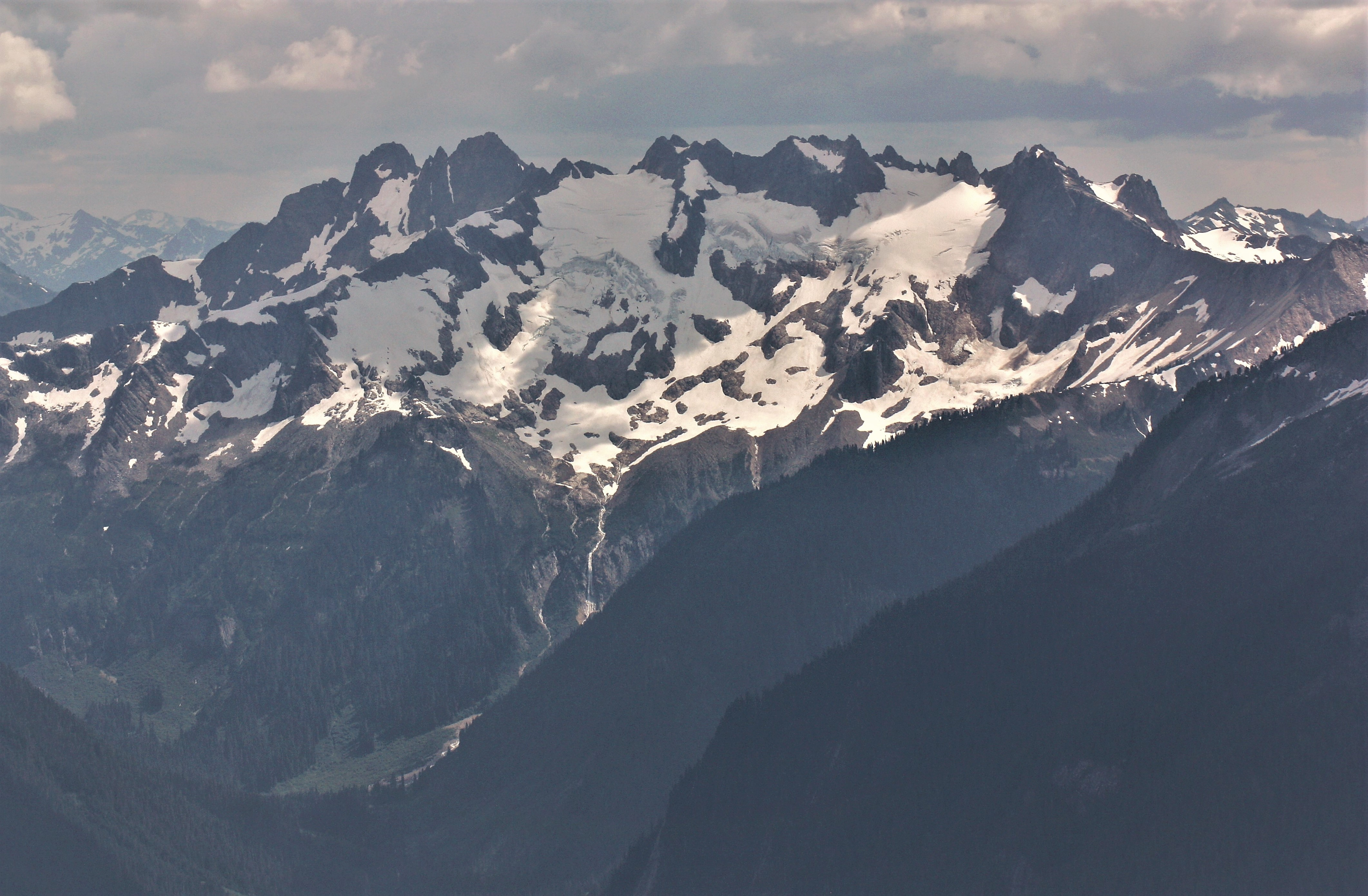
- North aspect, from Hidden Lake Peaks

Highest point
- Elevation: 7,320 ft (2,231 m)
- Prominence: 280 ft (85 m)
- Parent peak: Mount Misch (7,435 ft)
- Isolation: 0.62 mi (1.00 km)
- Coordinates: 48°21′05″N 121°12′22″W

Geography
- Location within Washington (state) Location within the United States
- Interactive map of Mount Buckindy
- Country: United States
- State: Washington
- County: Skagit
- Protected area: Glacier Peak Wilderness
- Parent range: Cascade Range; North Cascades
- Topo map: USGS Downey Mountain

Geology
- Rock type: mineralized Breccia pipe

Climbing
- First ascent: August 28, 1955, by Don Grimlund, Dave Nicholson, Win Trueblood
- Easiest route: class 4 scrambling

Mount Buckindy is a remote 7,320-foot-elevation (2,230-meter) mountain summit located in the North Cascades, in Skagit County of Washington state. It is the second-highest point of the Buckindy Range, or Buckindy Ridge. It is set in the Glacier Peak Wilderness on land managed by the Mount Baker-Snoqualmie National Forest. It is situated 20 miles east-northeast of Darrington, Washington, and 17 miles north-northwest of Glacier Peak which is one of the Cascade stratovolcanoes. Precipitation runoff from Mount Buckindy drains south to the Suiattle River via Buck Creek and Downey Creek, and north to the Cascade River via Kindy Creek. Topographic relief is significant as the summit rises 4,700 feet (1,400 meters) above Kindy Creek in less than two miles. The mountain's toponym is a portmanteau of Buck and Kindy Creeks, and has been officially adopted by the United States Board on Geographic Names.

== Climate ==
Mount Buckindy is located in the marine west coast climate zone of western North America. Most weather fronts originate in the Pacific Ocean, and travel northeast toward the Cascade Mountains. As fronts approach the North Cascades, they are forced upward by the peaks of the Cascade Range, causing them to drop their moisture in the form of rain or snowfall onto the Cascades (Orographic lift). As a result, the west side of the North Cascades experiences high precipitation, especially during the winter months in the form of snowfall. This climate supports the Kindy and Goat Creek Glaciers as well as glacierets on this mountain's slopes. During winter months, weather is usually cloudy, but due to high pressure systems over the Pacific Ocean that intensify during summer months, there is often little or no cloud cover during the summer.

== Geology ==
The North Cascades features some of the most rugged topography in the Cascade Range with craggy peaks, ridges, and deep glacial valleys. Geological events occurring many years ago created the diverse topography and drastic elevation changes over the Cascade Range leading to the various climate differences. These climate differences lead to vegetation variety defining the ecoregions in this area.

The history of the formation of the Cascade Mountains dates back millions of years ago to the late Eocene Epoch. With the North American Plate overriding the Pacific Plate, episodes of volcanic igneous activity persisted. In addition, small fragments of the oceanic and continental lithosphere called terranes created the North Cascades about 50 million years ago.

During the Pleistocene period dating back over two million years ago, glaciation advancing and retreating repeatedly scoured the landscape leaving deposits of rock debris. The U-shaped cross section of the river valleys is a result of recent glaciation. Uplift and faulting in combination with glaciation have been the dominant processes which have created the tall peaks and deep valleys of the North Cascades area. The rusty reddish color of Mount Buckindy and the Buckindy Range is due to mineralized breccia pipe.

== Gallery ==
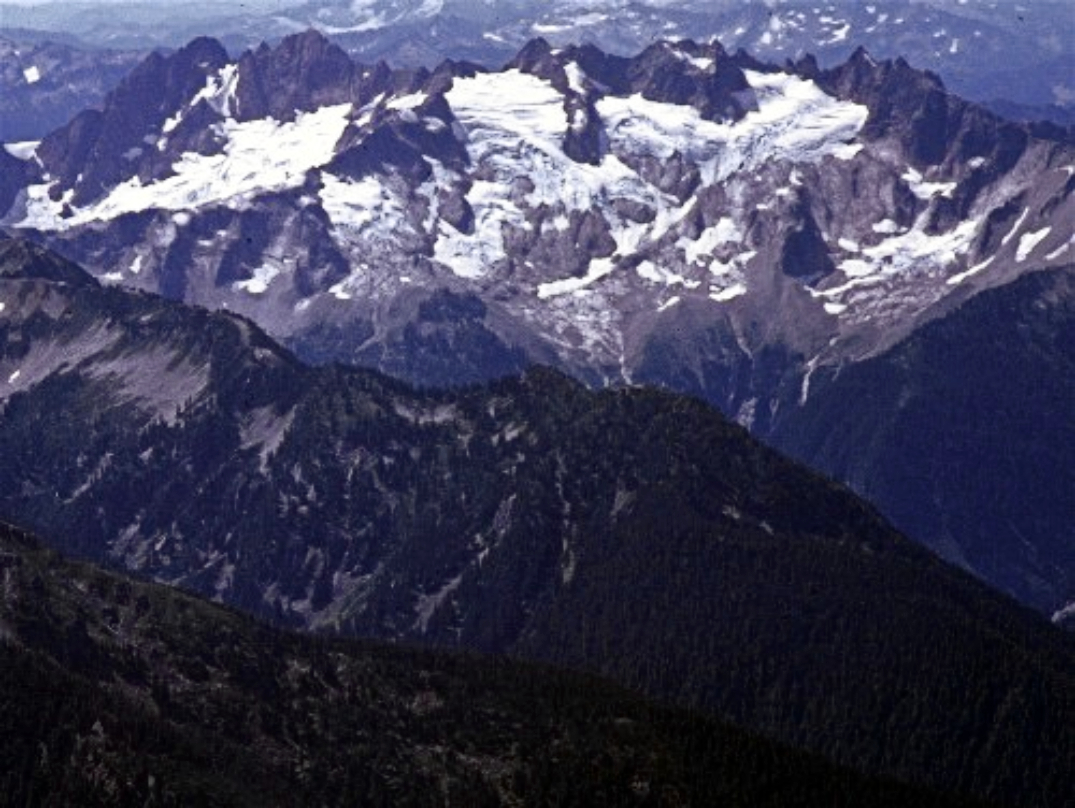
The Buckindy Range seen from Eldorado Peak with summit of Mt. Buckindy centered at top

== See also ==
- Geography of the North Cascades
- Geology of the Pacific Northwest
