= Meridian, Seattle =

- Seattle Neighborhood
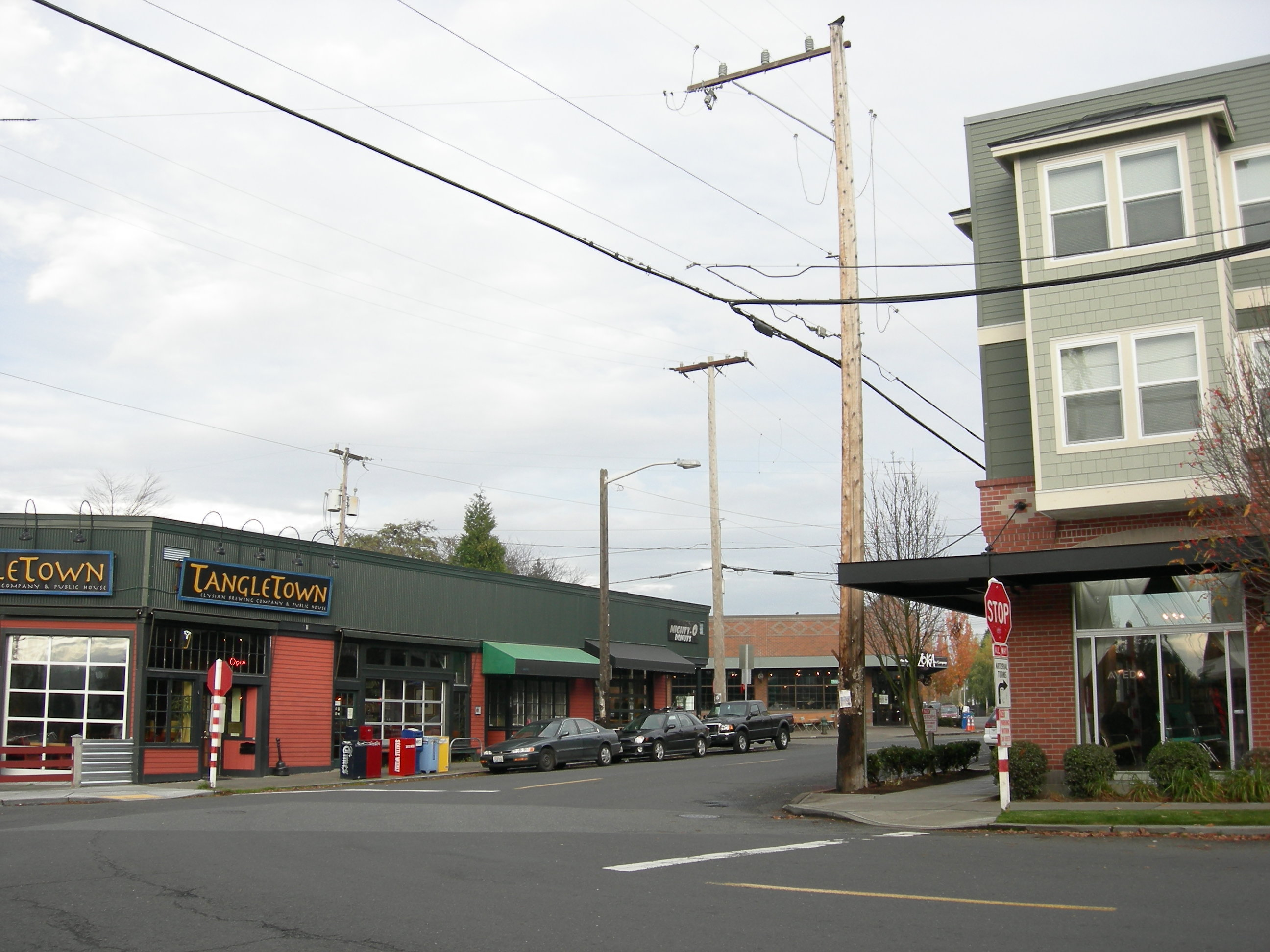
- Streetscape in Meridian
- Nickname: Tangletown
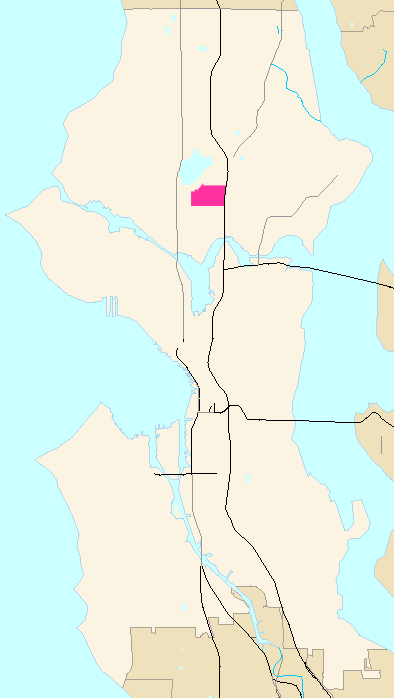
- Meridian highlighted in pink
- Coordinates: 47°40′08″N 122°19′54″W
- Country: United States
- State: Washington
- County: King
- City: Seattle
- ZIP Code: 98103, 98115
- Area Code: 206, 564

Meridian or Tangletown is the part of Seattle's Wallingford neighborhood that lies north of N 50th Street, near Green Lake. Of note are its "K streets": Kensington, Kenwood, Keystone, and Kirkwood Places N.

The concentration of mostly retail businesses on N 55th Street near Meridian Avenue is known variously as Tangletown or Meridian and considered by some to be more closely associated with Greenlake than Wallingford. The likely source for the name Tangletown is the irregular configuration of Seattle's street grid in this transition zone, where Wallingford shades into the Green Lake neighborhood, some of which follow the contours of Green Lake, others conforming to the city's basic grid. An alternative explanation is that the neighborhood was given the name Tangletown years ago, when a streetcar interchange occupied the space where businesses and condominiums now stand.

Meridian sometimes refers to a wider neighborhood than Tangletown, which refers strictly to the retail district. The name Meridian came from the Meridian Line, a streetcar line. The name became popular when it was used by brothers Stan and Milton Stapp who published the local newspaper, the North Central Outlook. They used the term to differentiate the area from the nearby neighborhoods of Greenlake and Wallingford.

One of the neighborhood's principal landmarks The Keystone Building, built in 1910 by D.J. Orner & Son (see image below) has been the home of various businesses over the years. In 1938, the building housed the Barclay's Grocery, Kenwood Market and Sires Brother's Paint Company. From 1956 it became the longstanding Lamont's Food Center until the 1980s when it was converted to the Honey Bear Bakery, while the East side of the building became the M&R Grocer. Today the West corner of the building is home to the TangleTown Public House (the old Honeybear bakery) while the East side is now the Mighty-O Donuts headquarters.

The neighborhood is bounded on the south by N 50th Street, beyond which is the rest of Wallingford; on the west by Green Lake Way N., beyond which is Woodland Park and Phinney Ridge; on the north by N 60th Street, beyond which is the Green Lake neighborhood, and on the east by Interstate 5, beyond which is the University District. Its main thoroughfares are Meridian Avenue N, Kirkwood Place N, and Latona Avenue NE (north- and southbound) and NE 56th Street (east- and westbound).

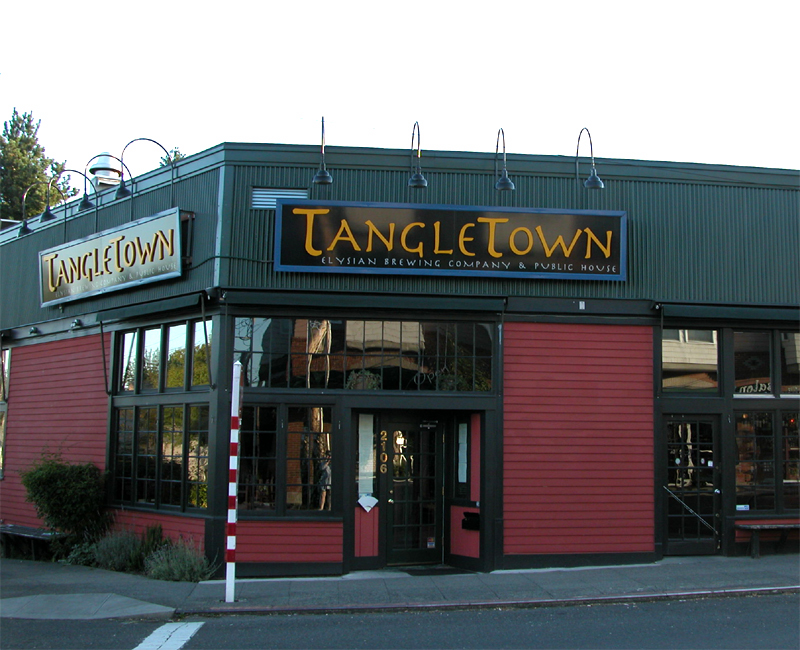
Tangletown pub
