= Marmite (restaurant) =

Defunct French restaurant in Seattle, Washington, U.S.

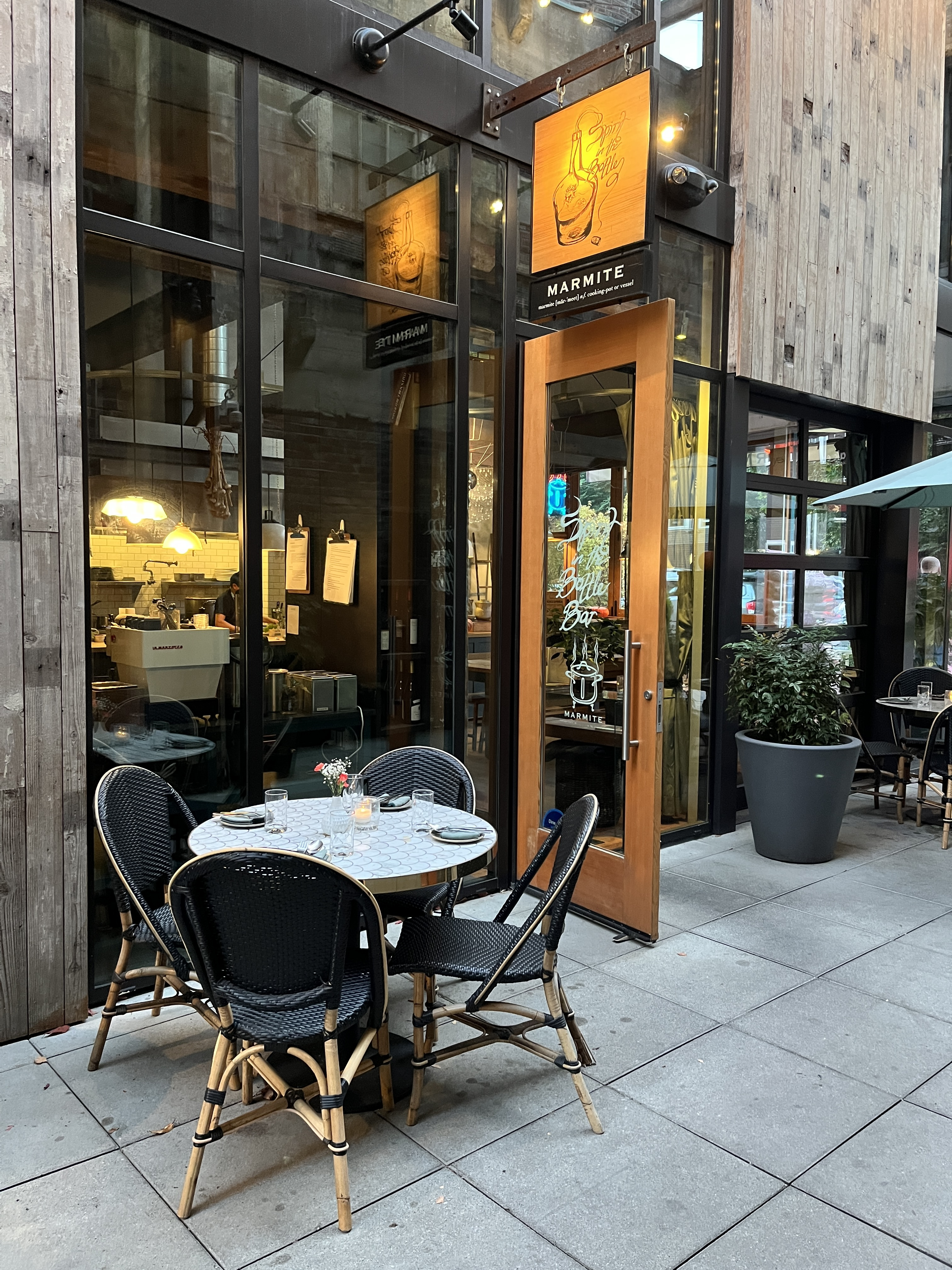
- The restaurant's exterior, October 2022
- Interactive map of Marmite

Restaurant information
- Food type: French
- Location: 1424 11th Avenue, Seattle, King, Washington, 98122, United States
- Coordinates: 47.6137°N 122.3179°W
- Website: marmiteseattle.com

Marmite was a French restaurant in Seattle, in the U.S. state of Washington. Established in late 2016, the Marmite was included in Bon Appétit's 2017 list of the 50 best new restaurants in the U.S., before closing in 2023.

== Description ==
Marmite was a French bistro in Seattle's Chophouse Row. Among seasonal soups were potage de légumes-racines (pureed root vegetable) and a soupe de deux potirons (pureed kabocha and cinderella pumpkins). The restaurant also served Bouillon Farni de Legumes et Gnocchi aux Trois Saveur (vegetables and gnocchi in a vegetable stock) and Soupe aux Ortis (puréed nettles and potato with chicken stock and creme fraiche). Marmite also served sandwiches, including a smoked pork variety.

== History ==
Plans for Bruce and Sarah Naftaly to open Marmite in the mixed-used development Chophouse Row, in the space previously occupied by Chop Shop, were reported by Eater Seattle in October 2016. The business rolled out services over several months, starting with take-out window service in December 2016. Marmite began full lunch service, followed by weekend brunch service, in January 2017. Dinner service followed in February 2017.

The cocktail lounge Spirit in the Bottle opened in the restaurant in April 2017. During the COVID-19 pandemic, Marmite operated via delivery and pick-up; among menu options were nettle soup, fried rabbit legs, and beef au jus sandwiches. On July 19, 2023, the owners confirmed plans to close at the end of the month. Eater Seattle reported plans for the Vietnamese restaurant Xom to move into the space.

== Reception ==
In 2017, the Marmite was included in Bon Appétit's list of the 50 best new restaurants in the United States. The magazine recommended the soup, the terrine de foie de volaille, duxelles-stuffed rabbit saddle, and the coq au vin. Seattle Metropolitan said the food was "far more casual" than what was served at the couples' previous restaurant Le Gourmand.

== See also ==
- List of defunct restaurants of the United States
- List of French restaurants
