= Chophouse Row =

Mixed-use development in Seattle, Washington, U.S.

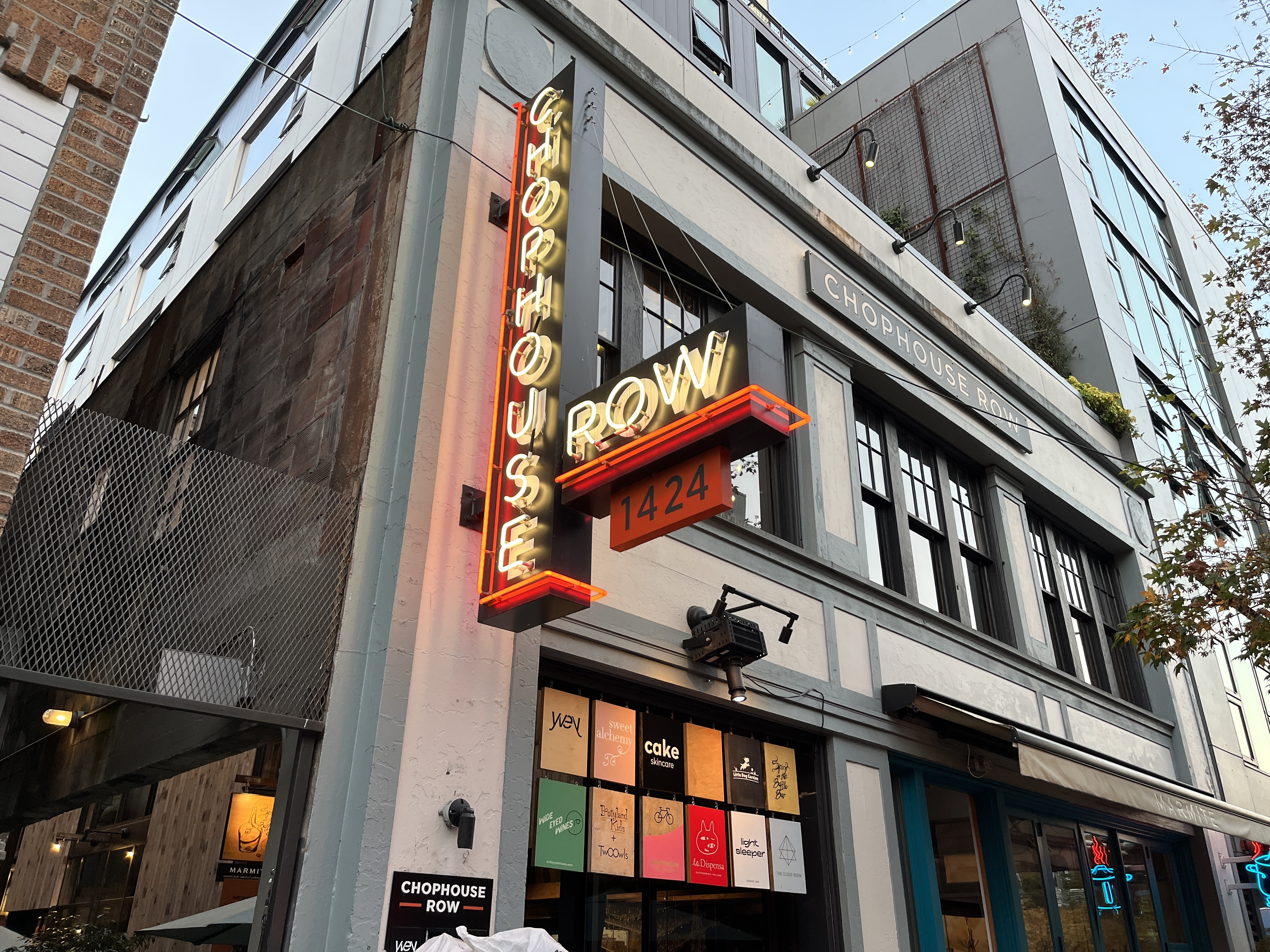
- Signage, 2022
- Location: Seattle, Washington, U.S.
- Interactive map of Chophouse Row
- Coordinates: 47°36′50″N 122°19′04″W

Chophouse Row is a mixed-use development on Seattle's Capitol Hill, in the U.S. state of Washington.

The $16 million project houses approximately 15 businesses amidst apartments and office spaces.

Chophouse Row opened in 2015. Previously, the space served as an automobile repair shop.

== Tenants ==
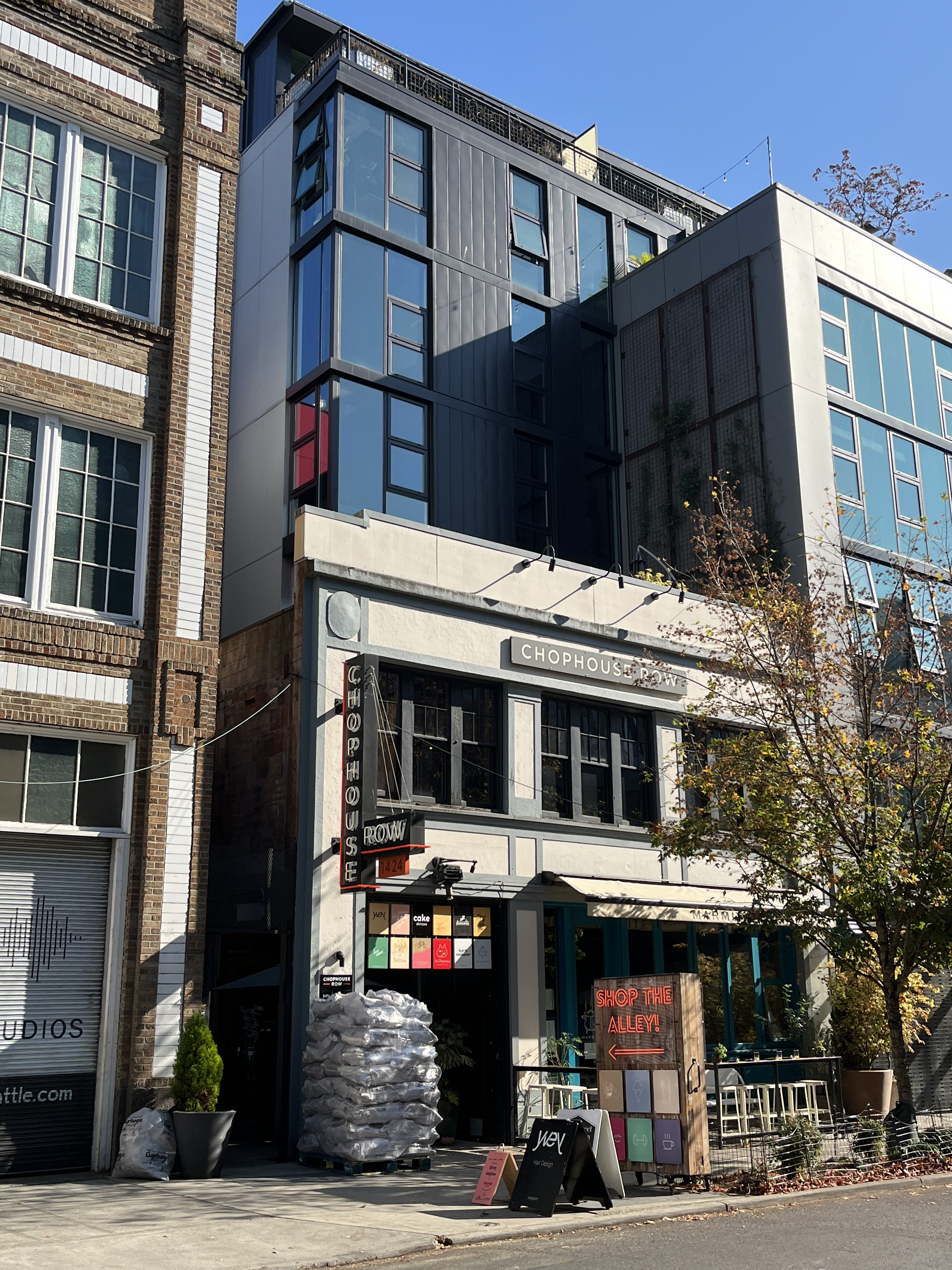
Exterior, 2022

By Tae operated art Chophouse Row from late 2018 or 2019 to 2021. The wine bar Light Sleeper opened in 2022. The business is slated to close permanently in February 2026.

Other businesses have included:

- Amandine
- Bar Ferdinand (or Bar Ferd'nand)
- Bootyland
- Chop Shop
- From Typhoon
- Kurt Farm Shop
- Marmite
- Sea'd In
- Sweet Alchemy
- Tailwind Cafe
- Tomo
- Two Owls
- Wunderground Coffee

== Reception ==
Chelsea Lin, Rosin Saez, and Zoe Sayler included Chophouse Row in Seattle Metropolitan's 2021 list of sixteen "of our favorite Capitol Hill shops".
