= Green Mountain Lookout =

- U.S. National Register of Historic Places
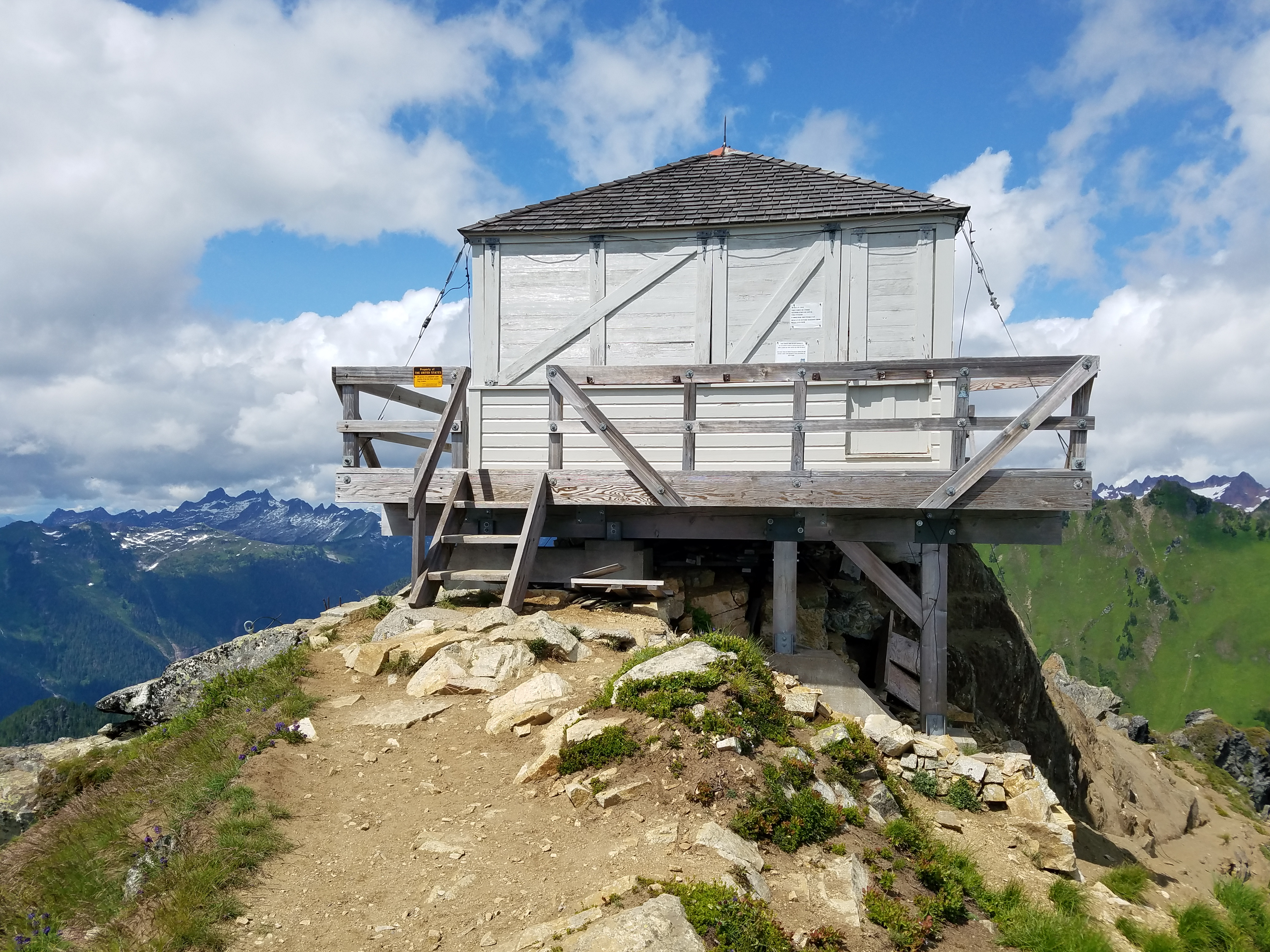
- Lookout in 2019

- Location within Washington (state) Location within the United States
- Location: Green Mountain, Darrington Ranger District, about 17 miles (27 km) east of Darrington, Washington
- Nearest city: Darrington, Washington
- Coordinates: 48°17′30″N 121°14′19″W
- Area: less than one acre
- Built: 1933
- Built by: Civilian Conservation Corps
- MPS: USDA Forest Service Fire Lookouts on Mt. Baker--Snoqualmie National Forest TR
- NRHP reference No.: 88000117
- Added to NRHP: February 22, 1988

The Green Mountain Lookout is a historic fire lookout tower located at the summit of Green Mountain in the Glacier Peak Wilderness and the Mount Baker-Snoqualmie National Forest in Snohomish County, Washington. The single-story wood-frame structure measures 14 by 14 feet (4.3 by 4.3 m) and was built according to a standard National Forest Service design in 1933 by the Civilian Conservation Corps. The structure includes an exterior catwalk and a cable anchor system to protect from strong winds.

The lookout was added to the National Register of Historic Places on February 22, 1988. A lawsuit filed in 2010 sought to remove the structure from the mountaintop, a move that was ultimately prevented by the Green Mountain Lookout Heritage Protection Act, which was passed by Congress in 2014.

== History ==
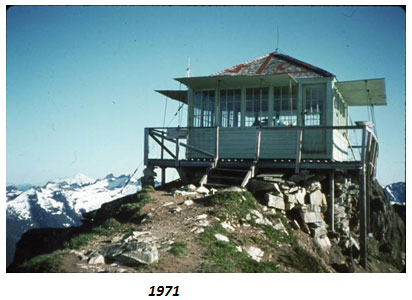
Lookout in 1971

The original structure was built in 1933 and was originally used as a fire lookout tower. Since its initial construction, the lookout has often been subjected to severe winter weather which has, on a number of occasions, caused structural damage requiring extensive repairs. In 1950, the roof was replaced and walls, windows, and doors were repaired after heavy snowfall damaged the building the previous winter.

The lookout ceased to be used for fire detection purposes after the 1980s, and in the mid-1990s, the building was closed to the public due to a damaged foundation and catwalk. In 2002, after a newly installed foundation was severely damaged by snowfall, the building was dismantled piece by piece, with pieces flown by helicopter to be repaired off-site. After delays from road washouts in 2003 and 2006, the foundation was repaired in 2009 and the building was reconstructed shortly thereafter, with the pieces flown back up to the mountaintop via helicopter.

In 2010, an environmental group called Wilderness Watch filed a lawsuit against the Forest Service, claiming that they violated federal law by using helicopters during the lookout restoration process. In 2012, a federal court in Seattle sided with the group and ordered the removal of the structure. In response, Senator Patty Murray introduced the Green Mountain Lookout Heritage Protection Act, which was written to amend existing law to prohibit the Forest Service from removing the lookout unless the structure poses a risk to public safety. The act was passed by Congress and signed into law by President Obama in 2014, superseding the court order and effectively preventing removal of the structure. In Darrington, Washington, the mayor received a standing ovation when he announced that the bill had passed the Senate. Scott Morris, of the Darrington Historical Society, said that the passage of the bill in the House was a "relief" and that he had "lost track of how long we have been dealing with this." The National Trust for Historic Preservation supported the bill; the president, Stephanie Meeks, stated that they were "pleased that Congress has acted to protect this historically significant and locally cherished landmark. With this vote, the House joins the Senate in affirming that the preservation of this historic resource is compatible with wilderness protection."
