= Oso Landslide Memorial =

Memorial site in Washington, United States

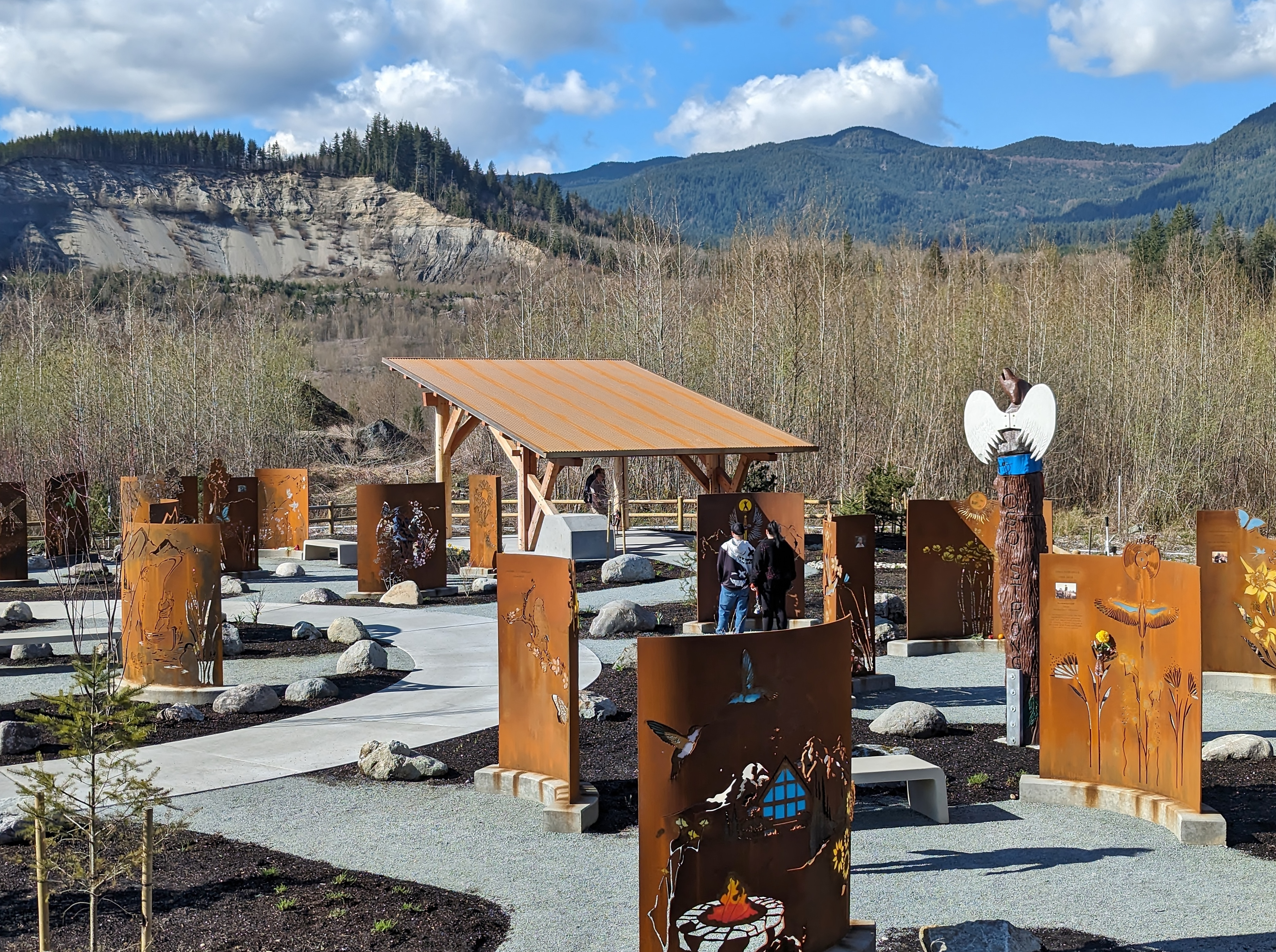
- View from Whitehorse Trail
- Interactive map of Oso Landslide Memorial
- Location: Snohomish County, Washington
- Nearest city: Oso, Washington
- Coordinates: 48°16′37″N 121°50′33″W
- Established: March 22, 2024
- Governing body: Snohomish County Department of Parks, Recreation & Tourism
- Website: www.slidememorial.com

The Oso Landslide Memorial is a memorial for the 43 victims of the Oso landslide in Snohomish County, Washington, United States. It is located along State Route 530 and the Whitehorse Trail east of Oso.

The Snohomish County Department of Parks, Recreation & Tourism announced on March 22, 2018, that plans had begun for a permanent memorial commemorating the victims. The tribute is located at the location of the slide and fundraising efforts began in 2018 with wood from the formerly standing memorial tree to be repurposed and used for the permanent display.

The $6 million memorial was funded by Snohomish County in March, 2022. Construction began in October 2022 with plans to complete it in time for the ten-year anniversary of the landslide. The new memorial opened on March 22, 2024.
