= Breccia pipe =

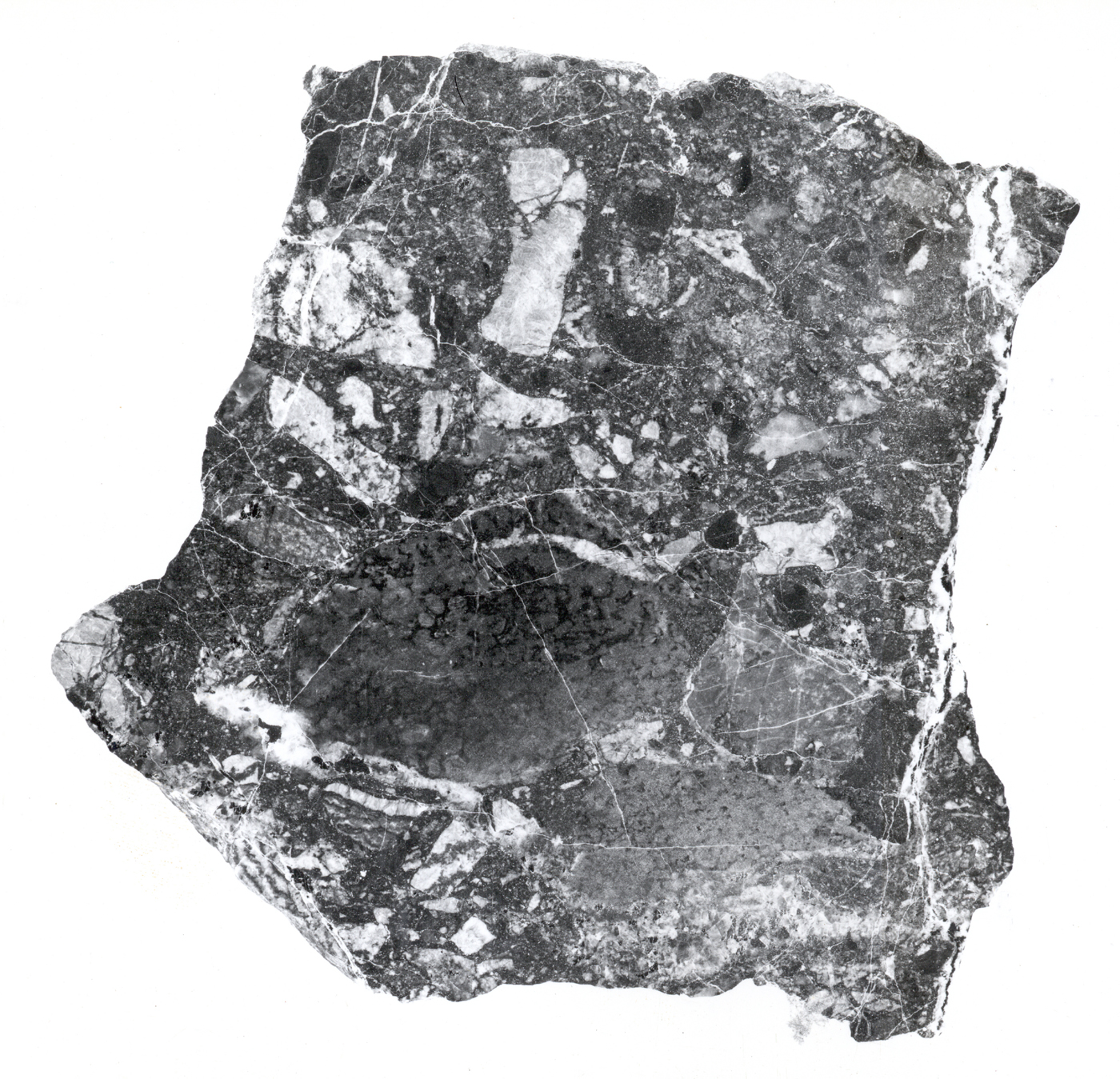
Breccia is typically silicified and consists of many smaller irregular rock fragments.

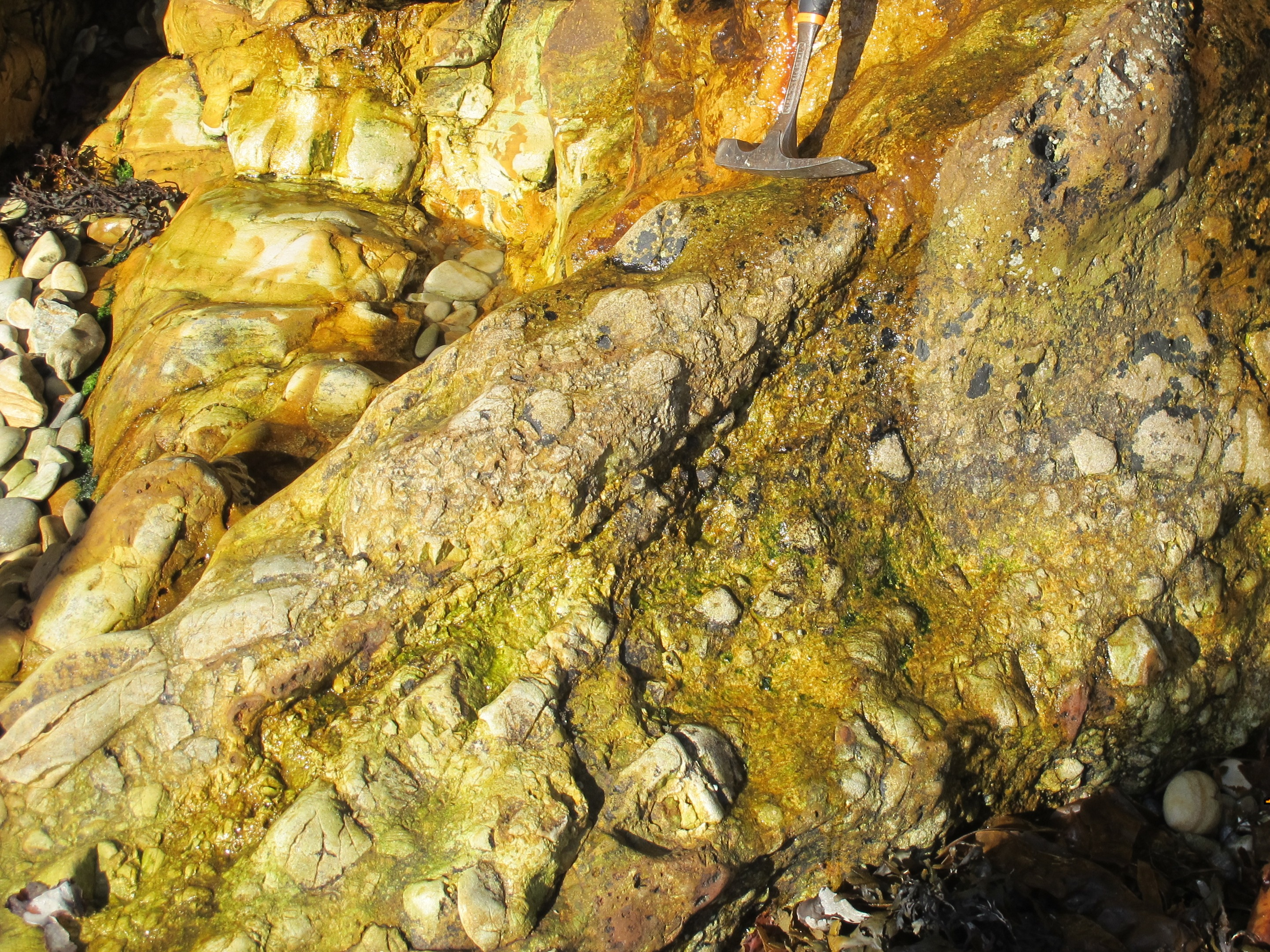
Breccia pipe cutting Eday Sandstone, Ophir Bay, Orkney

A breccia pipe, also referred to as a chimney, is a mass of breccia (rock composed of broken fragments of minerals or rock cemented together by a fine-grained matrix), often in an irregular and cylindrical shape.

== Characteristics ==
When exposed at the surface, a breccia pipe may appear as an iron-stained knob, from several feet to several hundred feet in diameter. Breccia pipes may or may not be silicified. They usually consist of fragments of the host rock (the rock layer they are contained in) cemented together by silica. They can also be cemented by finely ground host rock called rock flour. These formations are often hosts for ore deposition especially in copper and uranium mining districts. They are sensitive to oxidation, and due to their porous nature, may be oxidized to depths far below the ground surface. Breccia pipes that have never reached the Earth's surface are referred to as "blind".

=== Origin ===
Although the origin of breccia pipes is disputed, the most commonly accepted theory is that they formed at intersections of fractures. In these areas, hydrothermal solutions forced their way to the surface. However, there are some breccia pipes that are a result of limestone collapse by acidic water or other soluble rock types. Some breccia pipes show evidence of having been associated with magmatic activity; these breccia pipes were possibly formed by gas explosions.

=== Occurrence ===
Areas that contain many examples of breccia pipes include Copper Creek, Arizona, which contains approximately 500 mineralized breccia pipes, and the gold mining area of Cripple Creek, Colorado which contains breccia pipe ore deposits associated with a volcanic diatreme.

== See also ==
- Hydrothermal circulation – Circulation of water driven by heat exchange
- Vein (geology) – Sheetlike body of crystallized minerals within a rock
