= Mount Bullen =

Mountain in Washington (state), United States

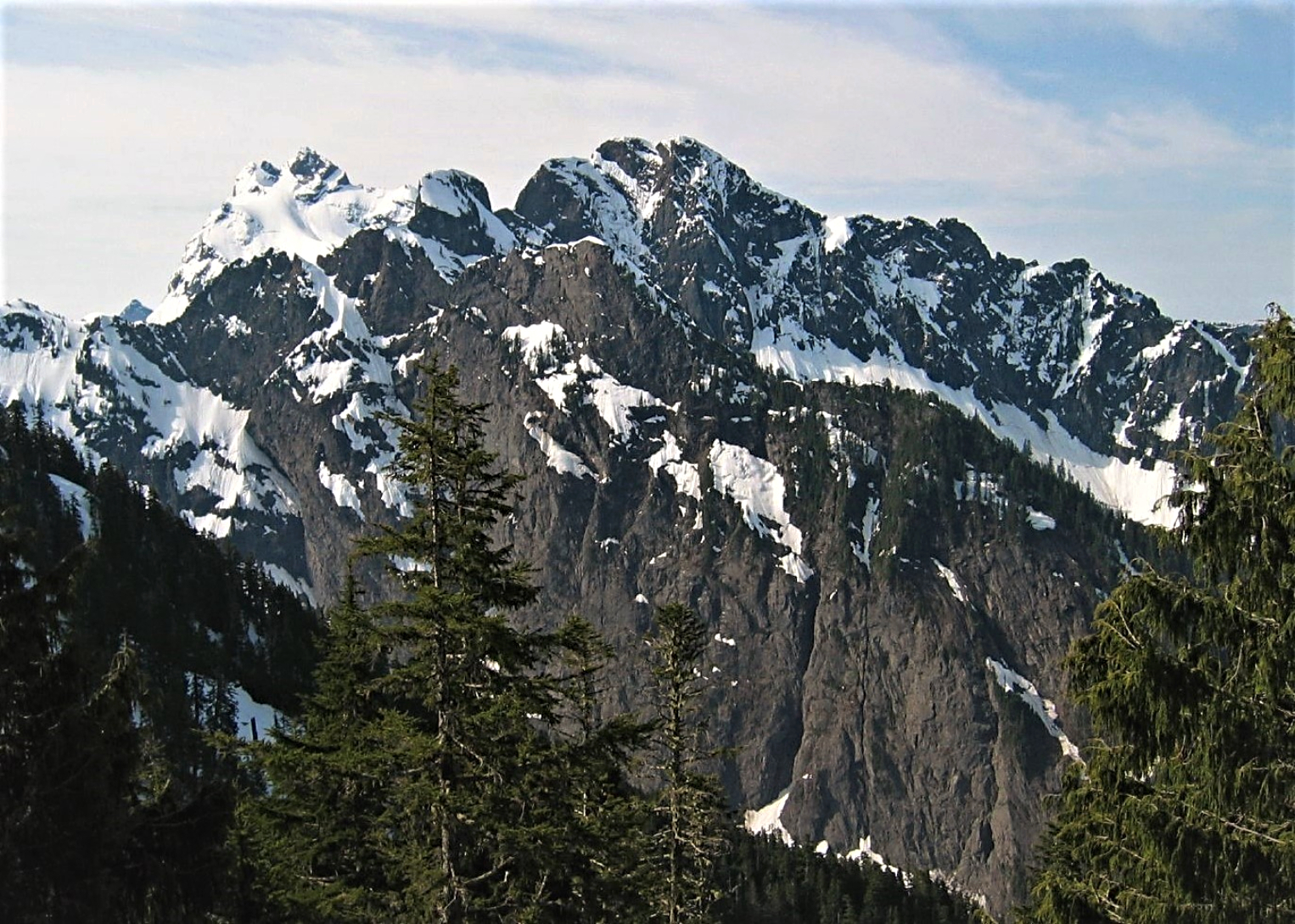
- North aspect

Highest point
- Elevation: 5,978 ft (1,822 m)
- Prominence: 920 ft (280 m)
- Parent peak: Whitehorse Mountain (6,850 ft)
- Isolation: 1.44 mi (2.32 km)
- Coordinates: 48°11′44″N 121°41′55″W

Naming
- Etymology: Chauncey Bullen

Geography
- Location within Washington (state) Location within the United States
- Interactive map of Mount Bullen
- Country: United States
- State: Washington
- County: Snohomish
- Protected area: Boulder River Wilderness
- Parent range: North Cascades; Cascade Range
- Topo map: USGS Whitehorse Mountain

Climbing
- First ascent: 1936 by Hermann Ulrichs
- Easiest route: class 2 scrambling

Mount Bullen is a 5,978-foot-elevation (1,822 m) mountain summit located at the western edge of the North Cascades, in Snohomish County of Washington state. It is situated 20 mi (32 km) east of the community of Arlington, Washington, in the Boulder River Wilderness, on land managed by Mount Baker-Snoqualmie National Forest. Nearby neighbors include line parent Whitehorse Mountain, 1.44 mi (2.32 km) to the northeast and Three Fingers, 1.84 mi (2.96 km) to the south. Precipitation runoff from the mountain drains into headwaters of the Boulder River. Topographic relief is significant as the southeast aspect rises 2,000 feet (610 meters) above Bullen Lake in approximately one-half mile, and the west aspect rises 4,200 feet (1,300 meters) above Boulder River in two miles.

== History ==
This mountain is named for Chauncey Bullen, a government log scaler who died as a result of a log falling from a railroad car near Darrington in 1919. This geographical feature's "Mount Bullen" spelling was officially adopted in 1990 by the U.S. Board on Geographic Names. Prior to that it was misspelled "Mount Bullon" which appears on older maps.

The first ascent of the summit was made in 1936 by Hermann F. Ulrichs and companion. Ulrichs wrote of the experience: "I felt as if we had joined Sisyphus and his rock in Hell."

== Climate ==
Mount Bullen is located in the marine west coast climate zone of western North America. Most weather fronts coming off the Pacific Ocean travel east toward the Cascade Mountains. As fronts approach the North Cascades, they are forced upward by the peaks of the Cascade Range (orographic lift), causing them to drop their moisture in the form of rain or snow onto the Cascades. As a result, the west side of the North Cascades experiences high precipitation, especially during the winter months in the form of snowfall. Because of maritime influence, snow tends to be wet and heavy, resulting in high avalanche danger. During winter months, weather is usually cloudy, but due to high pressure systems over the Pacific Ocean that intensify during summer months, there is often little or no cloud cover during the summer. Due to its temperate climate and proximity to the Pacific Ocean, areas west of the Cascade Crest very rarely experience temperatures below 0 °F (−18 °C) or above 80 °F (27 °C).

== Geology ==
The North Cascades features some of the most rugged topography in the Cascade Range with craggy peaks, ridges, and deep glacial valleys. Geological events occurring many years ago created the diverse topography and drastic elevation changes over the Cascade Range leading to the various climate differences. These climate differences lead to vegetation variety defining the ecoregions in this area.

The history of the formation of the Cascade Mountains dates back millions of years ago to the late Eocene Epoch. With the North American Plate overriding the Pacific Plate, episodes of volcanic igneous activity persisted. In addition, small fragments of the oceanic and continental lithosphere called terranes created the North Cascades about 50 million years ago.

During the Pleistocene period dating back over two million years ago, glaciation advancing and retreating repeatedly scoured the landscape leaving deposits of rock debris. The U-shaped cross sections of the river valleys are the result of recent glaciation. Uplift and faulting in combination with glaciation have been the dominant processes creating the tall peaks and deep valleys of the North Cascades area.

== Gallery ==
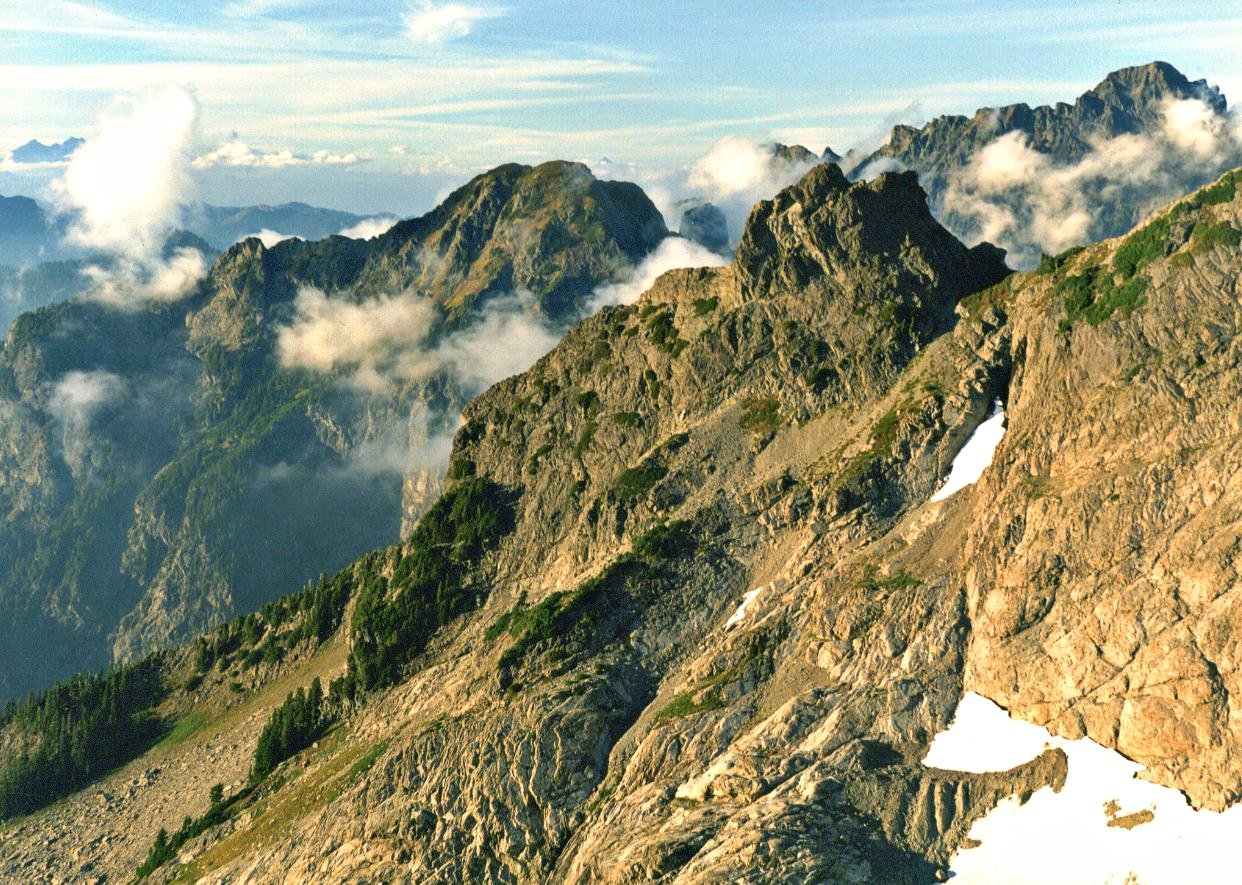
Mt. Bullen centered at top, Whitehorse Mountain in upper right corner. Slopes of Three Fingers in foreground.

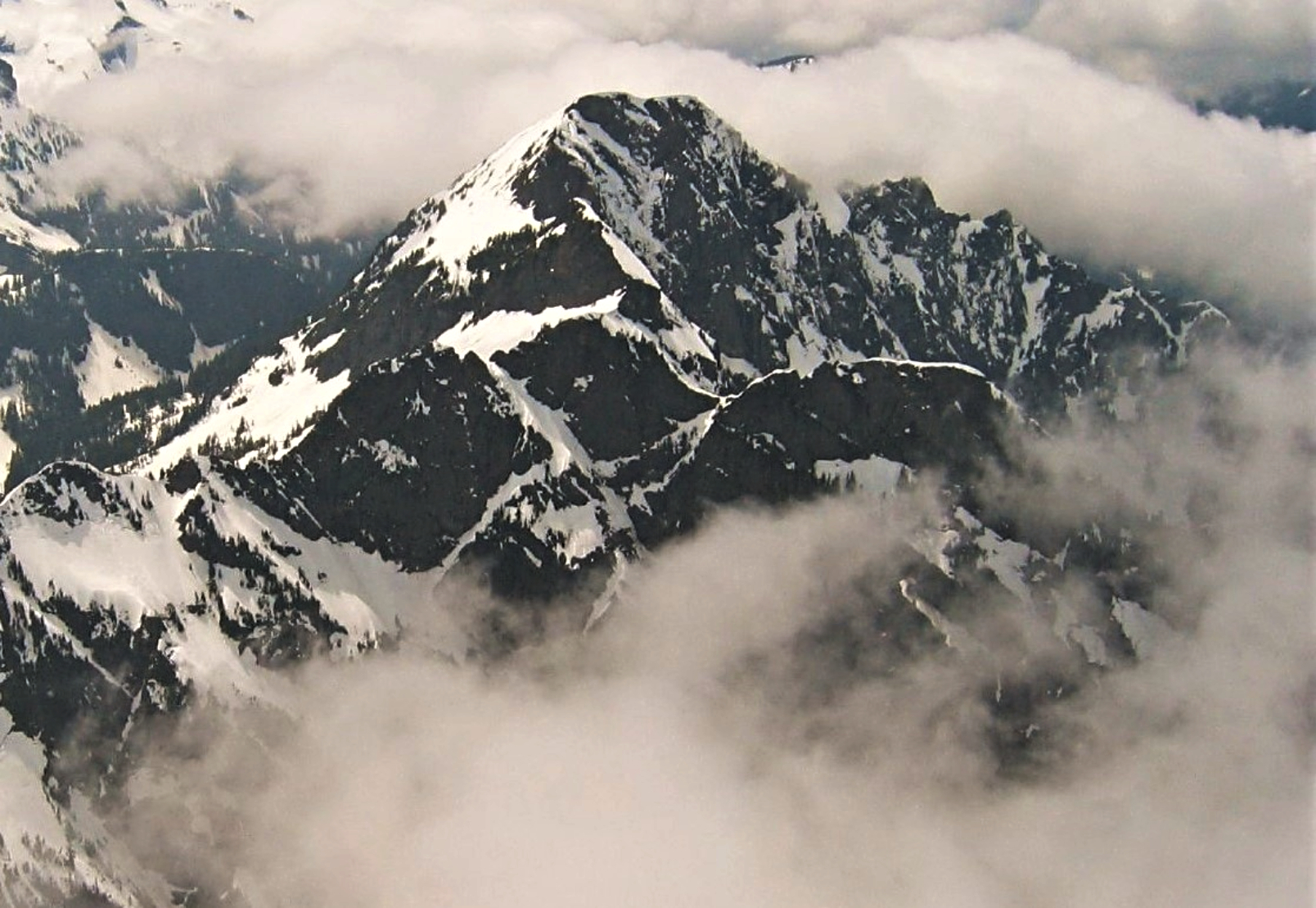
Mt. Bullen seen from Whitehorse Mountain

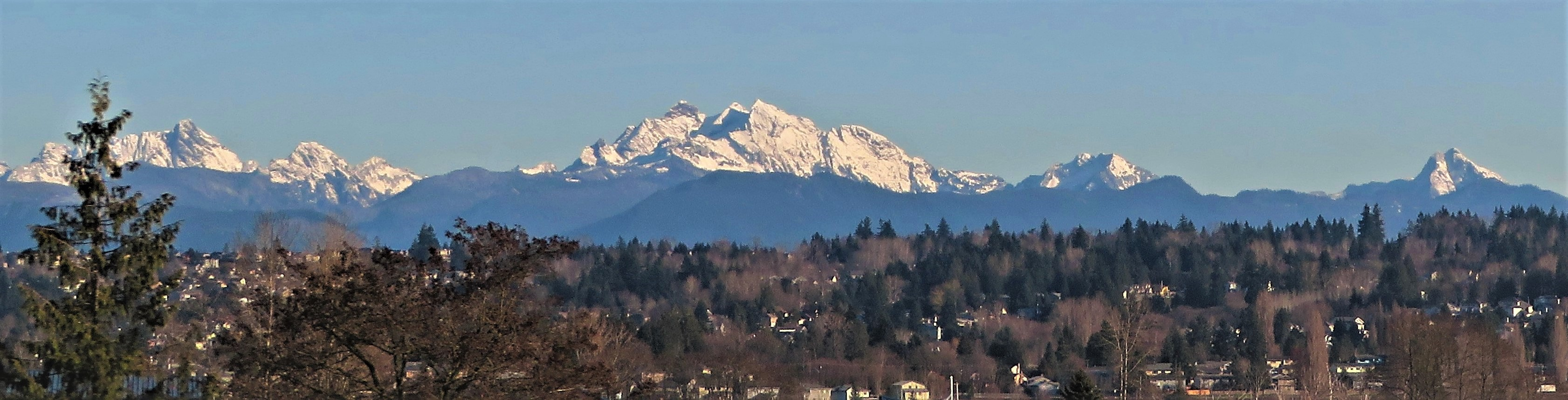
Left to rightː Whitehorse Mountain, Mount Bullen, Three Fingers (centered), Big Bear Mountain, Liberty Mountain

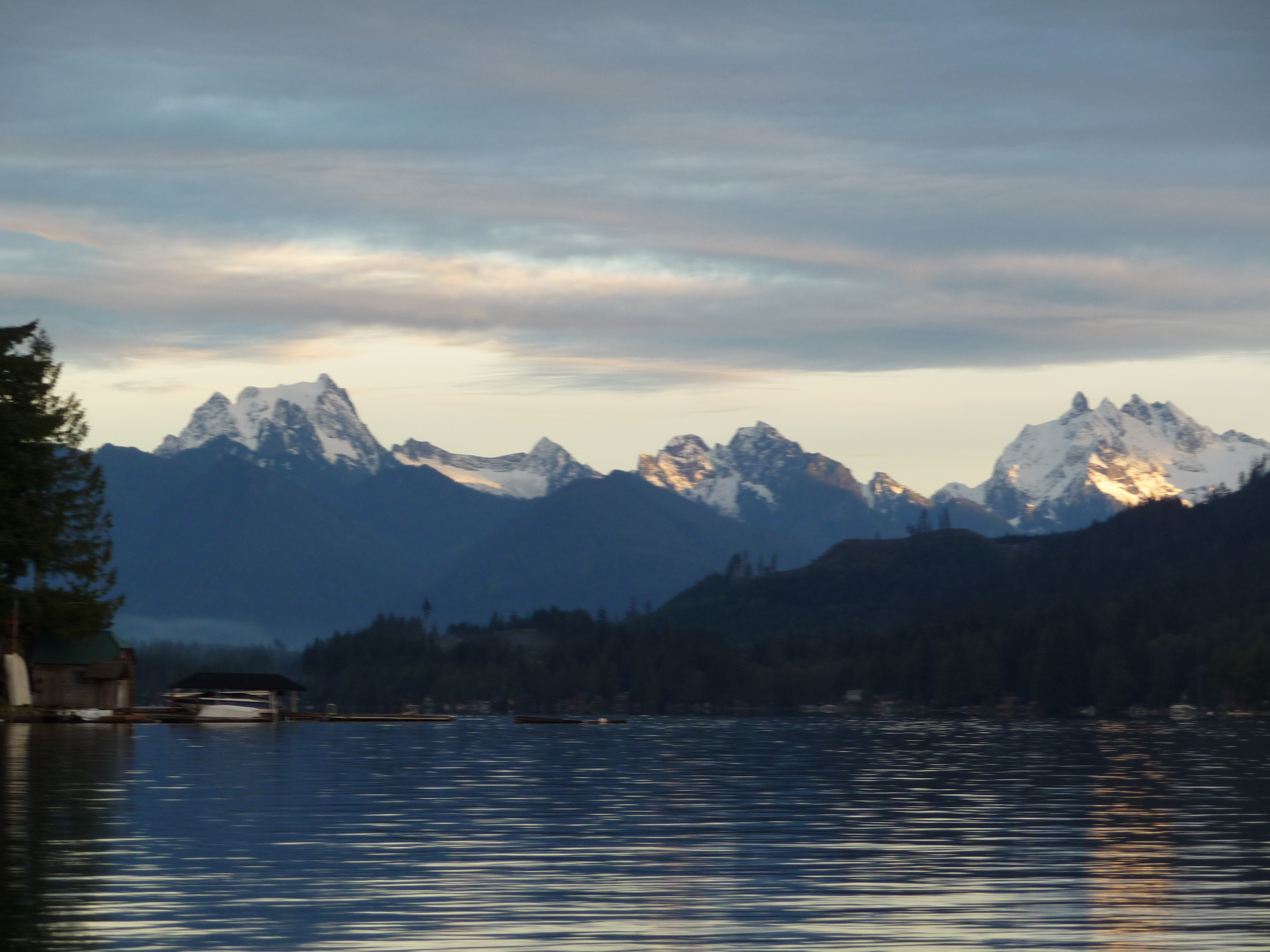
Whitehorse (left), Bullen (center), Three Fingers (right) seen from Lake Cavanaugh

== See also ==
- Geology of the Pacific Northwest
- Geography of the North Cascades
