= Leque Island =

Island in Snohomish County, Washington, United States

- Location within Washington (state)

Geography
- Location: Pacific Northwest
- Coordinates: 48.2309°N 122.3823°W

Administration
- United States
- State: Washington
- County: Snohomish County

Leque Island is a small island located in Snohomish County, in Washington, United States. It can be found just beneath the bridge between Camano Island and Stanwood, at the mouth of the Stillaguamish River, in Puget Sound.

Like the larger Florence Island, Leque is part of the Stillaguamish river delta. The island is formed where the Old Stillaguamish River Channel bifurcates at Leque's Point, with the South Pass flowing into Port Susan and the West Pass emptying into the southern end of Skagit Bay. Leque is separated from Camano to the west by Davis Slough.

Leque Island was originally a salt marsh. After being diked for agricultural purposes, the island was cut off from tidal influence and since then the areas not in use for agriculture have transformed into freshwater wetlands.

== History ==
A large lahar from a Glacier Peak eruption 12,500 years ago created the island and brought most of the alluvial soils.

The land near the island was occupied by local indigenous peoples for millennia before the arrival of white settlers. The local peoples fished and harvested various marine foodstuff from the surrounding waters. Early written accounts describe the island as a place of portage to the Olympic Peninsula, and tell of a local leader known as "Split-Lip Jim" who rented canoes and women to row them.

The first Europeans to arrive in the area, in the early- to mid-1800s, were loggers, who installed a logging mill on Leque Island. An early settler on the island was a Norwegian named O. B. Iverson, who wrote a description of Leque Island and the Stillaguamish River. In the 1870s, he partnered with three other men, his brother-in-law Andy Danielson, Nils Eide, and Nels P. Leque to purchase Leque Island for the purpose of farming. Eide claimed the north end of the island through the Land Act of 1820. The men and their families drained, diked and installed drainage ditches across the island to control flooding. The main crops produced on the island were oats and hay and cattle. These families farmed the land of Leque Island for several generations, eventually selling the parcels off to other farmers. Since 1974, the Washington Department of Fish and Wildlife has purchased 325 acres (132 hectares) of the island and contracted farmers to plant grains for wintering waterfowl.

More recently, Leque Island had suffered repeated levee failures, which endangered the local roadway, Washington State Route 532.

Today the island is a Wildlife Recreation Area, where people come for bird watching, photography, and to hunt ducks, geese and pheasants during hunting season, with the pheasants being stocked on-site.

== Hydrology ==
The Stillaguamish River provides freshwater feed to the island and deposits nutrients and sediment. The groundwater of the island, flowing from east to south, is usually found one foot or less from the surface, with the result that exposed seeps discharge into the man-made drainage ditches.

== Flora ==
The uncultivated parts of the island are mainly covered in an invasive non-native species, such as reed canary grass, holly, Himalayan blackberries, tansy, St Johns wort, oxeye daisies and stinky Bob.

Some common native plants on the island are common rushes, reeds and sedges, cattails and mud disks. Other native plants on the island include yarrow, lady and sword ferns, blue aster, thistles, sweet pea, clovers, rose hips, fireweed, plantain, a stand of dead cottonwoods Populus sect. Aigeiros.

Corn and wheat are also planted on the island by contract farmers. Marine plants in the area are more difficult to ascertain but red kelp, pickleweed and eelgrass have been observed washed up on the beaches of the island and can be assumed to reside in the area.

== Fauna ==
The wildlife on the island itself consists mostly of a large and diverse bird community, including marsh hawks, western sandpipers, loons, seagulls, peregrine falcons, ducks, geese, great blue herons, golden eagles, pheasants (stocked), dunlins, phoebes, least sandpipers, greater yellowlegs (Tringa melanoleuca), black-bellied plovers (Pluvialis squatarola). and short-eared owls. The Audubon Society has identified the area as a major stop on the Pacific Flyway.

The island is also home to small mammals. Rodents live in burrows in the tall grass; raccoons feed on seafood found on the beach, particularly crustaceans. Insects include bees, butterflies, and crickets. There are many common garden spiders. Marine organisms in the surrounding water, which have been identified by the Port Susan Marine Stewardship Conservation Action Plan, are:

- Eastern soft shell clam (Mya arenaria) and sand shrimp (Neotrypaea californiensis)
- Dungeness crab (Cancer magister) non-native purple varnish clam (Nuttallia obscurata)
- Coho, king, steelhead, cutthroat, rainbow trout, chum, sockeye and pink including a number of threatened species, and Chinook (Oncorhynchus tshawytscha)
- Pacific herring (Clupea pallasi), surf smelt (Hypomesus pretiosus), and the Pacific sand lance (Ammodytes hexapterus)

A study by the Stillaguamish Tribe's Natural Resources Department, in conjunction with Pacific Coastal Salmon Recovery Funding, about Stillaguamish Estuary Use by Juvenile Chinook, established that the Port Susan area, which envelopes Leque Island and extends southward, hosts two genetically distinct populations of Chinook salmon. The study showed that threatened Chinook around Leque Island depend on its estuaries, and recommended the restoration of these habitats to their wild state.

== Port Susan Marine Stewardship Area (MSA) ==
In 2007, the Port Susan Marine Stewardship Area was established, encompassing the entire Port Susan Bay, including the coastlines and Leque Island. The stewardship is managed by a number of environmental groups, and works towards improving the health of the waters around the island. The changes in the estuaries and marshes on Leque Island, carried out to promote agriculture, such as diking and draining, were identified as one of the threats to the marine ecosystem in the area.

The Nature Conservancy has created detailed ratings of the various aspects of the Leque Island ecosystem and the surrounding area, and the MSA makes use of this information to plan environmental controls and improvement targets for the island.

== Proposed restoration ==
In accordance with the Port Susan Marine Stewardship Master Plan, a project was planned to restore some areas of the island to a more natural state. The project was scheduled to begin January 1, 2005 and to end on June 1, 2009. In 2004, Ducks Unlimited, the main funding agency for the restoration project on Leque Island, received a $569,356 grant for levee setback and restoration on the island. In 2007, they received an additional $97,750 from Puget Sound Acquisition and Restoration Funds for installation of the project.

Plans called for a removal of the southernmost portion of the dike surrounding the island and re-using those materials to build a setback dike closer to the highway. This would re-connect the remaining sloughs with the freshwater of the Stillaguamish River which had been separated for about a century. It would also result in a large portion, but not all of the island undergoing regular tidal inundation. About 100 acres (40 hectares) would be conserved for the established freshwater wetlands and mixed recreational use, including increased access for those with limited mobility, and some agriculture. This would restore 115 acres (47 hectares) to the tide, creating estuarine intertidal vegetated wetlands, as well as conserving 72 acres (29 hectares) of the existing freshwater wetland habitat for public access. The Salmon Recovery Funding Board identified these changes as important for improving rearing habitat for juvenile salmonids, including at least two threatened species.

Ducks Unlimited attempted to employ the Washington State's Department of Fish and Wildlife's Hydraulic Project Approval process, which has the power to exempt projects from local permitting regulations. The Farm Bureau contested the HPA process, citing the size and scale of the project. Mediation was not successful, and the restoration was delayed until the permits were issued in May 2009.

In the fall of 2009, Camano Water Systems Association and the Juniper Beach Water District raised concerns to the Snohomish County Planning and Development Services, that removal of the existing dikes on Leque would put the sole source aquifer for Camano Island in danger of saltwater intrusion, endangering Camano's water supply. Three separate hydrologists investigated and determined that the removal of the dikes on Leque Island would not be expected to impact the water quality of Camano Island's groundwater aquifer; the Environmental Protection Association then issued a Determination of Non-significance for the project. The concerned groups refused to accept the results, and called for a full Environmental Impact Statement including an extensive groundwater impact study. After extensive testing by an EPA hydrologist and a technical committee, the EPA ruled once again in 2013 that the removal of the dikes would not affect the any aspect of Camano's water supply. The study pushed the project past the permit dates and required petition of Snohomish County to extend the life of the permits and increasing the expenditures for the permitting process.

Nine years after the project began, more than a million dollars had been spent, and the planning part of the project was completed, but no restoration had been done. The completed plan calls for parts of the wetlands, on which many of the island's birds depend, to be inundated with saline waters. Critics continue to be concerned that hunting and bird watching, and related economic activity, could be reduced, and point to the loss of the site as a pheasant release site, and the flooding of agricultural land.
