= Boulder River Waterfalls =

Waterfalls in Washington (state), United States

The Boulder River is home to 3 waterfalls, one just below its headwaters and the other 2 closer to its mouth. Below are descriptions of all 3:

== Craig Lakes Falls ==
Craig Lakes Falls
- Location: Snohomish County, Washington, U.S.
- Type: Horsetail
- Total height: 400 feet (120 m)
- Number of drops: 1
- Total width: 40 feet (12 m)
- Watercourse: Boulder River

Craig Lakes Falls, at 48°10′59″N 121°42′24″W, occurs about 0.5 miles downstream from the outlet of the lower of the Craig Lakes. The falls are a single horsetail of 400 feet and stay consistent in volume all year. Reaching the falls requires a 2-day round trip trek through the Boulder River Wilderness meaning that most are discouraged from going to the falls due to its extremely difficult access.

== Boulder Falls ==
Boulder Falls
- Location: Snohomish County, Washington, U.S.
- Type: Segmented Cascade
- Total height: 40 feet (12 m)
- Number of drops: 1
- Total width: 60 feet (18 m)
- Watercourse: Boulder River

Boulder Falls, at 48°14′48″N 121°49′39″W is countless times confused with Feature Show Falls. The reason for that is that Boulder Falls can only be heard from the Boulder River Trail but not seen. Boulder Falls is also marked on most maps, while Feature Show Falls is not. Feature Show Falls is easily seen from trail, so when people get to Feature Show Falls, they assume its Boulder Falls. One has to go off trail to reach Boulder Falls.

Boulder Falls is aptly named because it simply occurs where the river drops about 40 feet through a large boulder garden.

== Half Mile Falls ==
Half Mile Falls
- Location: Snohomish County, Washington, U.S.
- Type: Horsetail
- Number of drops: 1
- Watercourse: Boulder River

Half Mile Falls, at 48°15′47″N 121°48′38″W, also known as Lower Boulder Falls, is the final waterfall on the Boulder River. It occurs about ¼ of the way between Boulder Falls and the river's mouth. It is about 35 feet tall and is very difficult to reach without a GPS. The falls dump into a large pool.

== See also ==
- Boulder River Wilderness
