= Three finger =

Three finger may refer to:

== Arts and entertainment ==
- "Three Fingers", a song from the Buckethead album Enter the Chicken
- Three Fingered Jenny, a 1916 American silent short mystery directed by Edward LeSaint and written by Harvey Gates
- A character in the film series Wrong Turn
- Scruggs style, a banjo style also known as three-finger style

== Geography ==
- Three Fingers (Washington), a prominent mountain in the Northern Cascades in Washington, United States
- Three Finger Lake, in Halifax Regional Municipality, Nova Scotia, Canada
- Three Fingered Jack, a Pleistocene volcano in the Cascade Range of Oregon, United States
- Three Fingers Lookout, historic fire observation building

== People ==
- Mordecai Brown, nicknamed "Three Finger" or "Miner", American Major League Baseball pitcher
- William White (gangster), "Three Fingers", a Prohibition gangster and member of the Chicago Outfit
- Robert H. Birch, Robert H. "Three-Fingered" Birch, a 19th-century American adventurer, soldier and prospector
- Three Fingered Jack (Jamaica), leader of slave runaways
- Three Finger Brice, American baseball player
- Tommy Lucchese, Italian-American gangster

== Salutes ==
- Three-finger salute (Serbian), a salute used by Serbs
- Three-finger salute (Sicilian), a salute used by Sicilian nationalists and separatists
- Three-finger salute (pro-democracy), a gesture originally from the Hunger Games books and films and later used in protests in Myanmar and Thailand
- Three-finger salute, a jocular term for the three-key command Control-Alt-Delete
- Scout sign and salute, the salute of the World Scouting Movement

== Other uses ==
- Three-toed sloth, an animal species
- Three-finger toxin, a toxin protein
- Control-Alt-Delete, a jocular term for the three key combination that causes an operating system interrupt
- Sign of the cross, a blessing gesture also known as three finger cross

== See also ==
- Third finger
