= Big Bear Mountain =

Mountain in Washington (state), United States

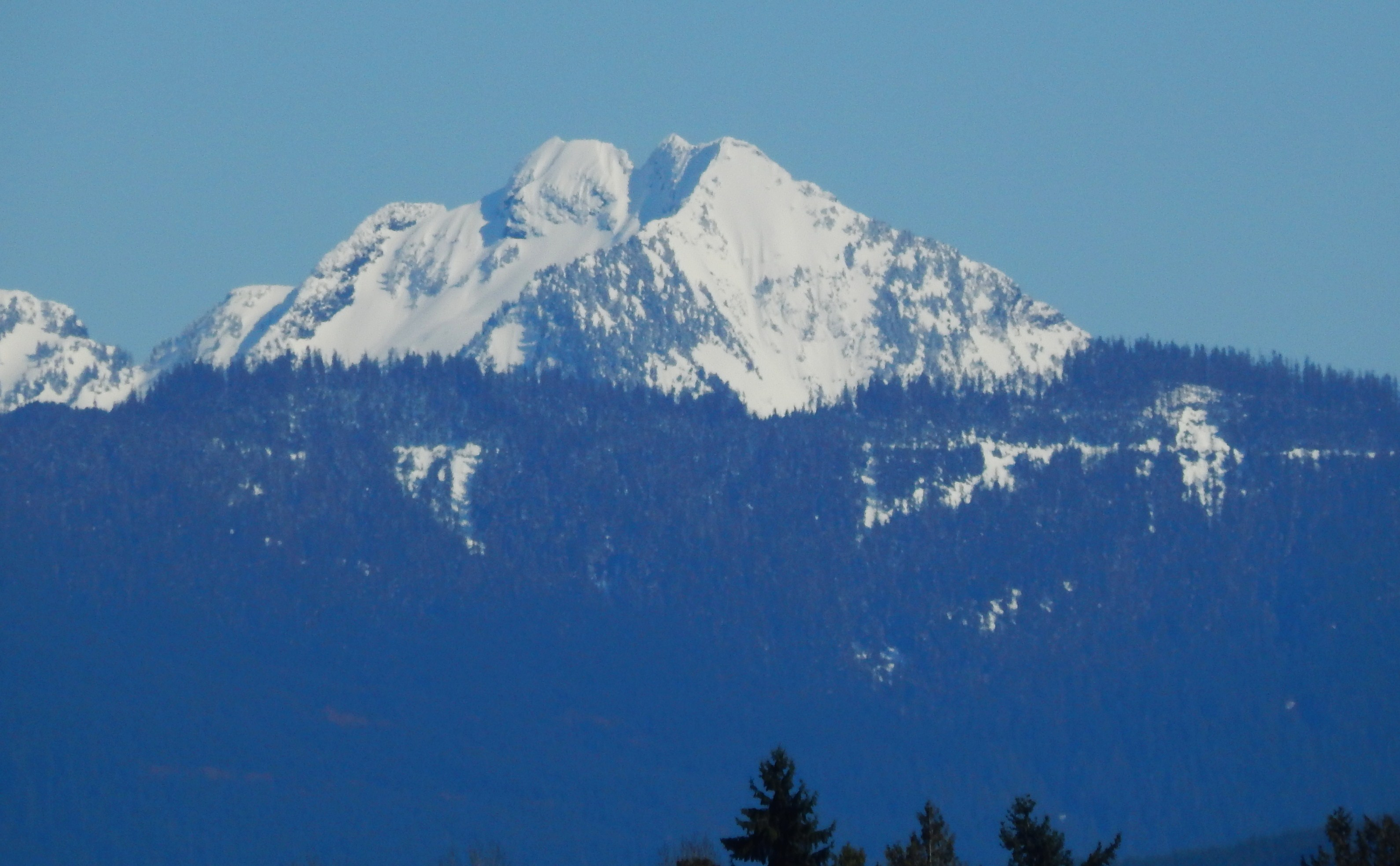
- Big Bear Mountain seen from Lake Stevens, WA

Highest point
- Elevation: 5,641 ft (1,719 m)
- Prominence: 761 ft (232 m)
- Parent peak: Three Fingers (6,850 ft)
- Isolation: 1.35 mi (2.17 km)
- Coordinates: 48°09′04″N 121°40′47″W

Geography
- Location within Washington (state) Location within the United States
- Location: Boulder River Wilderness; Snohomish County, Washington; United States
- Parent range: Cascade Range
- Topo map: USGS Whitehorse Mountain

Climbing
- Easiest route: Scrambling

Big Bear Mountain is a 5,641-foot (1,719 m) summit located at the western edge of the North Cascades, in Snohomish County of Washington state. It is located midway between Three Fingers to its north, and Liberty Mountain to its south. Big Bear Mountain is situated in the Boulder River Wilderness on land administered by the Mount Baker-Snoqualmie National Forest. Precipitation runoff from the mountain drains into tributaries of the Sauk and Stillaguamish Rivers.

== Climate ==
Big Bear Mountain is located in the marine west coast climate zone of western North America. Most weather fronts originate in the Pacific Ocean, and travel northeast toward the Cascade Mountains. As fronts approach the North Cascades, they are forced upward by the peaks of the Cascade Range, causing them to drop their moisture in the form of rain or snowfall onto the Cascades (Orographic lift). As a result, the west side of the North Cascades experiences high precipitation, especially during the winter months in the form of snowfall. Due to its temperate climate and proximity to the Pacific Ocean, areas west of the Cascade Crest very rarely experience temperatures below 0 °F (−18 °C) or above 80 °F (27 °C). During winter months, weather is usually cloudy, but, due to high pressure systems over the Pacific Ocean that intensify during summer months, there is often little or no cloud cover during the summer. Because of maritime influence, snow tends to be wet and heavy, resulting in high avalanche danger.

== Geology ==
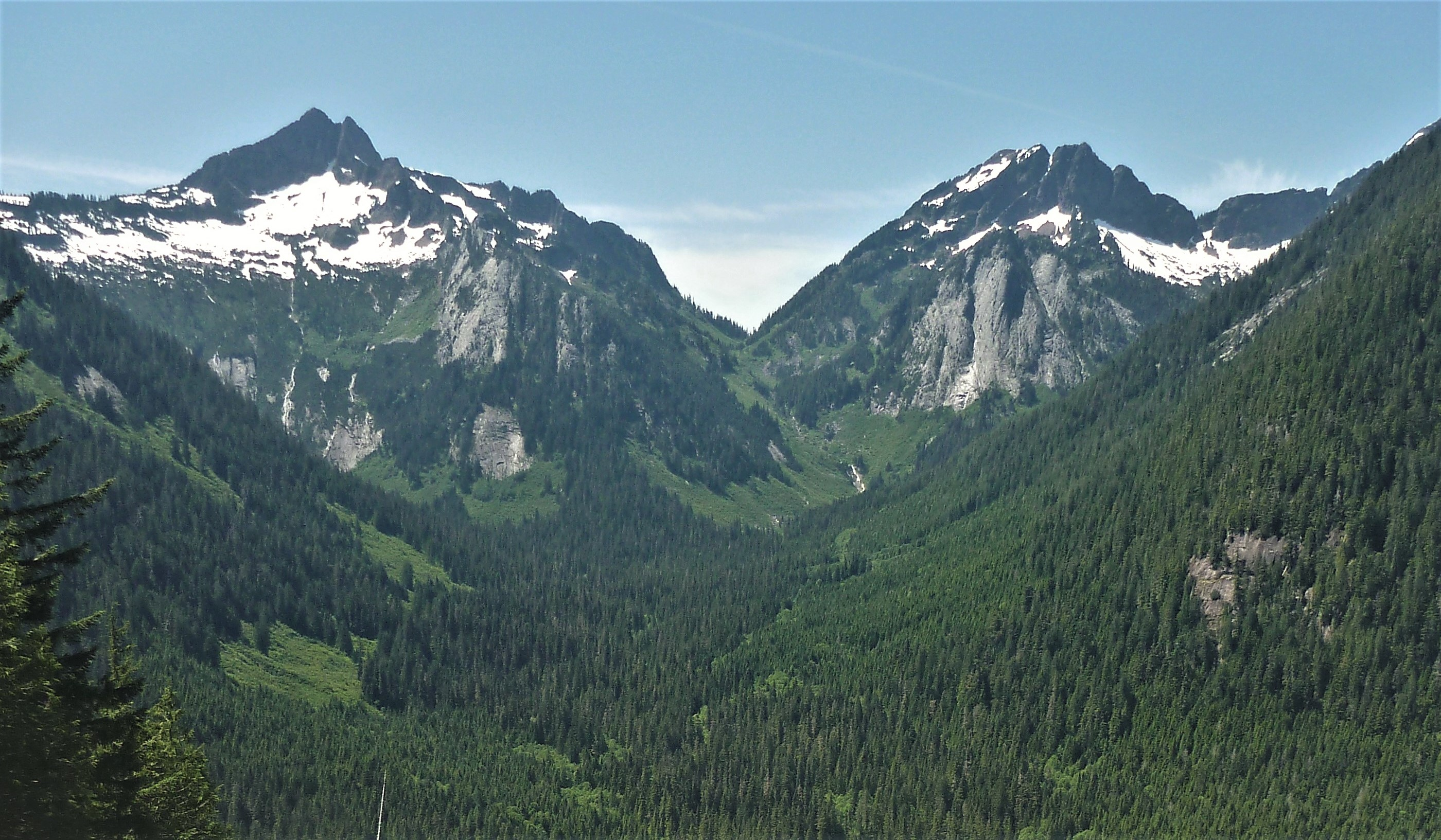
Liberty Mountain (left) and Big Bear Mountain (right) seen from the east

The North Cascades features some of the most rugged topography in the Cascade Range with craggy peaks, ridges, and deep glacial valleys. Geological events occurring many years ago created the diverse topography and drastic elevation changes over the Cascade Range leading to the various climate differences. These climate differences lead to vegetation variety defining the ecoregions in this area.

The history of the formation of the Cascade Mountains dates back millions of years ago to the late Eocene Epoch. With the North American Plate overriding the Pacific Plate, episodes of volcanic igneous activity persisted. In addition, small fragments of the oceanic and continental lithosphere called terranes created the North Cascades about 50 million years ago.

During the Pleistocene period dating back over two million years ago, glaciation advancing and retreating repeatedly scoured the landscape leaving deposits of rock debris. The U-shaped cross section of the river valleys is a result of recent glaciation. Uplift and faulting in combination with glaciation have been the dominant processes which have created the tall peaks and deep valleys of the North Cascades area.

== See also ==
- Geography of the North Cascades
- Geology of the Pacific Northwest
