= Washington State Route 532 =

State highway in Washington, US

State Route 532
- SR 532 highlighted in red.

Route information
- Auxiliary route of I-5
- Maintained by WSDOT
- Length: 10.09 mi (16.24 km)
- Existed: 1964–present

Major junctions
- West end: Sunrise Boulevard in Camano Island
- East end: I-5 near Stanwood

Location
- Country: United States
- State: Washington
- Counties: Island, Snohomish

Highway system
- State highways in Washington; Interstate; US; State; Scenic; Pre-1964; 1964 renumbering; Former
← SR 531	→ SR 534

State Route 532 (SR 532) is a short Washington state highway in Island and Snohomish counties, located in the United States. It connects Camano Island and Stanwood to a junction with Interstate 5 (I-5) northwest of Arlington.

The eastern section of the road was constructed in 1887 and was connected to Camano Island by a cable ferry, which was replaced by a bridge opened in 1909. The highway was paved in 1916 and acquired by the state government in 1945, becoming Secondary State Highway 1Y (SSH 1Y). The state funded new bridges across the Stillaguamish River and Davis Slough and later renumbered the highway as SR 532 in 1964, a few years before the highway was moved to a new roadway. From to 2009 to 2010, major sections of the highway were rebuilt, including a new bridge over the Stillaguamish River.

== Route description ==
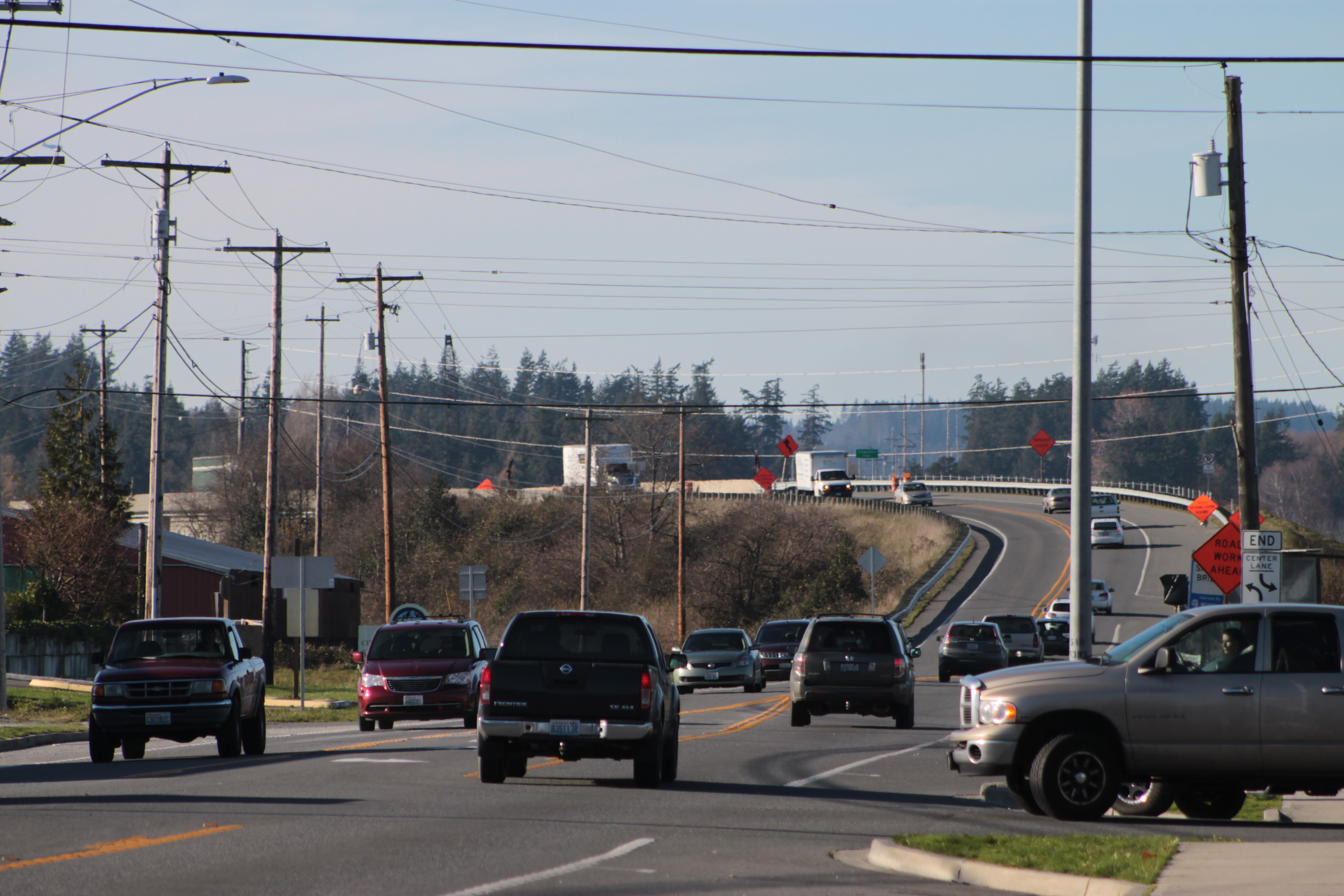
Looking westbound on SR 532 in downtown Stanwood, towards the Camano Gateway Bridge

SR 532 begins at the intersection of Camano Drive and Sunrise Boulevard at the Y-shaped Terry's Corner on Camano Island. The highway passes the island's branch library and park-and-ride, traveling east across farmland on the north side of Livingston Bay. It then descends from the hilltop and crosses Davis Slough, a small stream that marks the boundary between Island and Snohomish counties. SR 532 continues across the wetland and crosses the main arm of the Stillaguamish River on the Camano Gateway Bridge at the west end of Stanwood.

The highway runs through Stanwood on the south side of the city, following the bank of the Stillaguamish River. Near the city's eastern downtown and Amtrak station, SR 532 crosses over a railroad and intersects the Pioneer Highway, which was formerly signed as SR 530. From downtown Stanwood, the road passes through the city's suburban hilltop neighborhoods, including a business district centered at 72nd Avenue Northwest. SR 532 curves southeasterly after leaving the city, but returns to a northeasterly path near Sunday Lake. The highway ends at an interchange with I-5 near another park-and-ride lot, while the road continues east to SR 9 at Bryant.

SR 532 is maintained by the Washington State Department of Transportation (WSDOT), which conducts an annual survey on the state's highways to measure traffic volume in terms of annual average daily traffic. In 2016, WSDOT calculated that 21,000 vehicles traveled on SR 532 in downtown Stanwood and 12,000 used it near the I-5 interchange, the highest and lowest traffic counts along the highway, respectively.

== History ==
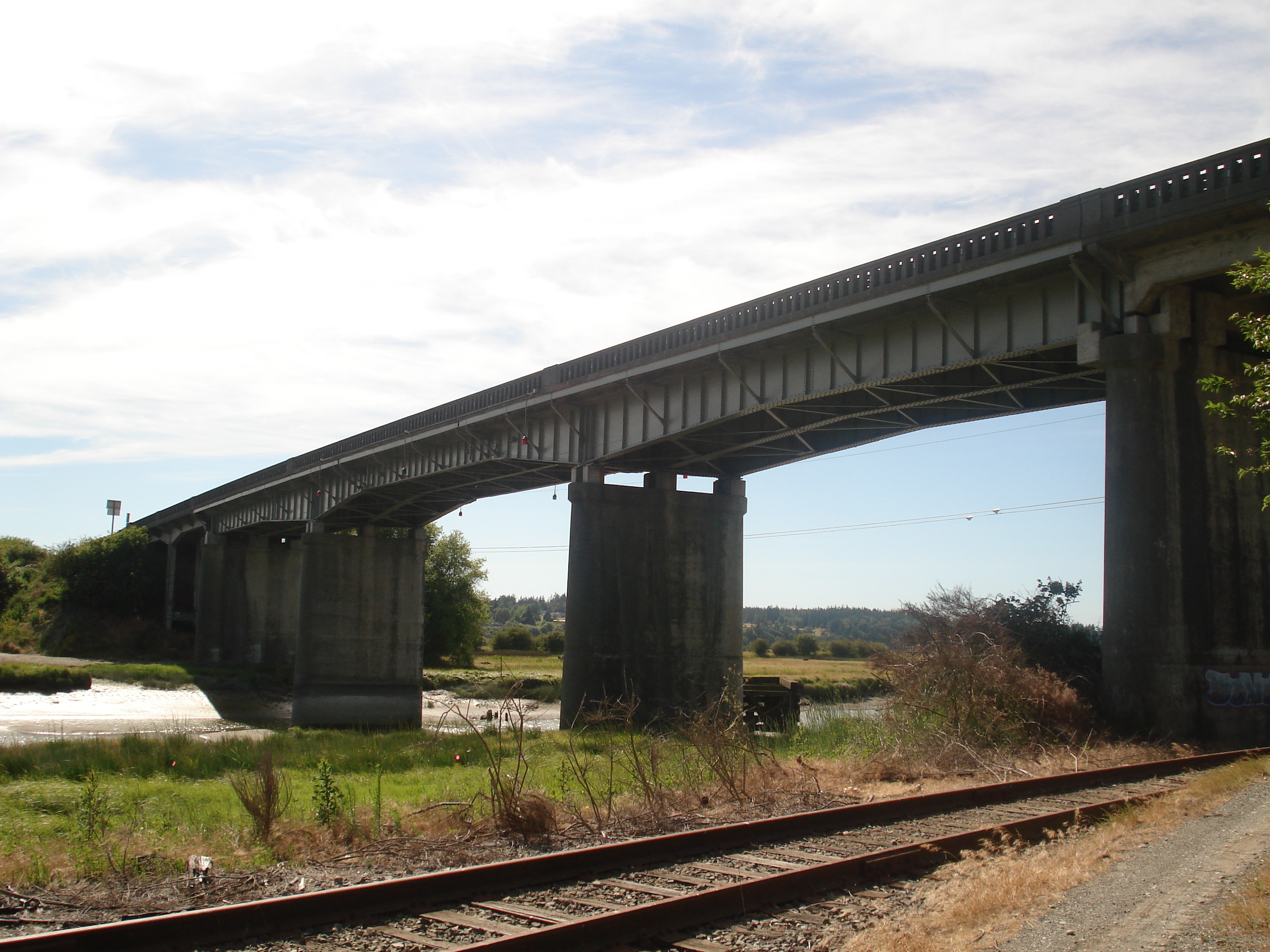
SR 532 crossed the Stillaguamish River on the Mark Clark Bridge, which served as the only road connection to Camano Island until 2010

Stanwood and Camano Island were originally connected by a horse-pulled cable ferry on the Stillaguamish River, which was replaced by a steel swing bridge that opened on August 7, 1909. A lift bridge across the Davis Slough was completed in 1912. The eastern approach through Stanwood and neighboring East Stanwood was paved with bricks in 1913, replacing a wagon road built in 1887 to Bryant. The rest of the road was paved by the Snohomish County government in 1916, completing a Stanwood–Arlington highway.

The state government took over maintenance of the Stanwood–Camano highway in 1945, designating it as Secondary State Highway 1Y (SSH 1Y). SSH 1Y ran from Camano Island to East Stanwood, where it was briefly concurrent with SSH 1E, and continued to a junction with Primary State Highway 1 (PSH 1, also signed as U.S. Route 99). At the request of the three communities, the state government allocated $615,000 in funds (equivalent to $6.4 million in 2024 dollars) to construct a new bridge over both the Stillaguamish River and Davis Slough. The new concrete bridge over the Stillaguamish River was opened on July 23, 1950, and named for World War II general Mark Wayne Clark, who resided seasonally on Camano Island. Further lobbying from Stanwood resulted in a $395,500 budget allotment (equivalent to $3.2 million in 2024 dollars) to relocate most of SSH 1Y onto a more southerly highway that would bypass East Stanwood and include modern shoulders and gentler grades. The first phase, centered around a railroad overpass south of East Stanwood, was completed as scheduled in November 1962, despite part of the overpass collapsing midway through construction. The remaining highway between East Stanwood and US 99 (later rebuilt as I-5) was completed in October 1969, serving a temporary partial cloverleaf interchange until I-5 was expanded in 1972.

During the 1964 highway renumbering, SSH 1Y was replaced by SR 532 and SSH 1E became SR 530. In the 1990s, population growth in Stanwood led to a 70 percent increase in traffic along some sections of SR 532. WSDOT conducted several corridor and traffic studies for the highway in the early 2000s, recommending that SR 532 be expanded to five lanes by 2022 to handle expected traffic growth. The Nickel gas tax program approved by the state legislature in 2005 included $84 million to fund a series of expansion and replacement projects along SR 532.

The corridor improvement program included a replacement for the Mark Clark Bridge, pavement repairs on the railroad overpass, and the addition of several truck climbing lanes, left-turn lanes, and sidewalks in downtown Stanwood. Construction began in 2009 and a majority of the projects were completed by the following year. The Camano Gateway Bridge was opened to traffic on August 13, 2010, replacing the Mark Clark Bridge. The new bridge has 14-foot (4.3 m) shoulders for bicyclists and pedestrians and meets modern earthquake standards. A replacement for the Davis Slough Bridge began construction in August 2014 and was completed in May 2016, costing $29.3 million and funded with state gas taxes. The new bridge includes widened shoulders and was raised 5 feet (1.5 m) higher to reduce disruptions during floods and high tide.

== Major intersections ==
County	Location	mi	km	Destinations	Notes
Island	Camano Island	0.00	0.00	Sunrise Boulevard – Camano Island State Park; Northeast Camano Drive – Camano Island State Park	Western terminus; roadway continues south as Camano Drive
Snohomish	Stanwood	5.25	8.45	Pioneer Highway – Conway, Silvana	Former SR 530
Snohomish		10.09	16.24	I-5 – Bellingham, Everett, Seattle	Eastern terminus; roadway continues as Stanwood–Bryant Road
1.000 mi = 1.609 km; 1.000 km = 0.621 mi
