= Feature Show Falls =

Waterfall in Washington (state), United States

Coordinates: 48°14′22″N 121°49′23″W

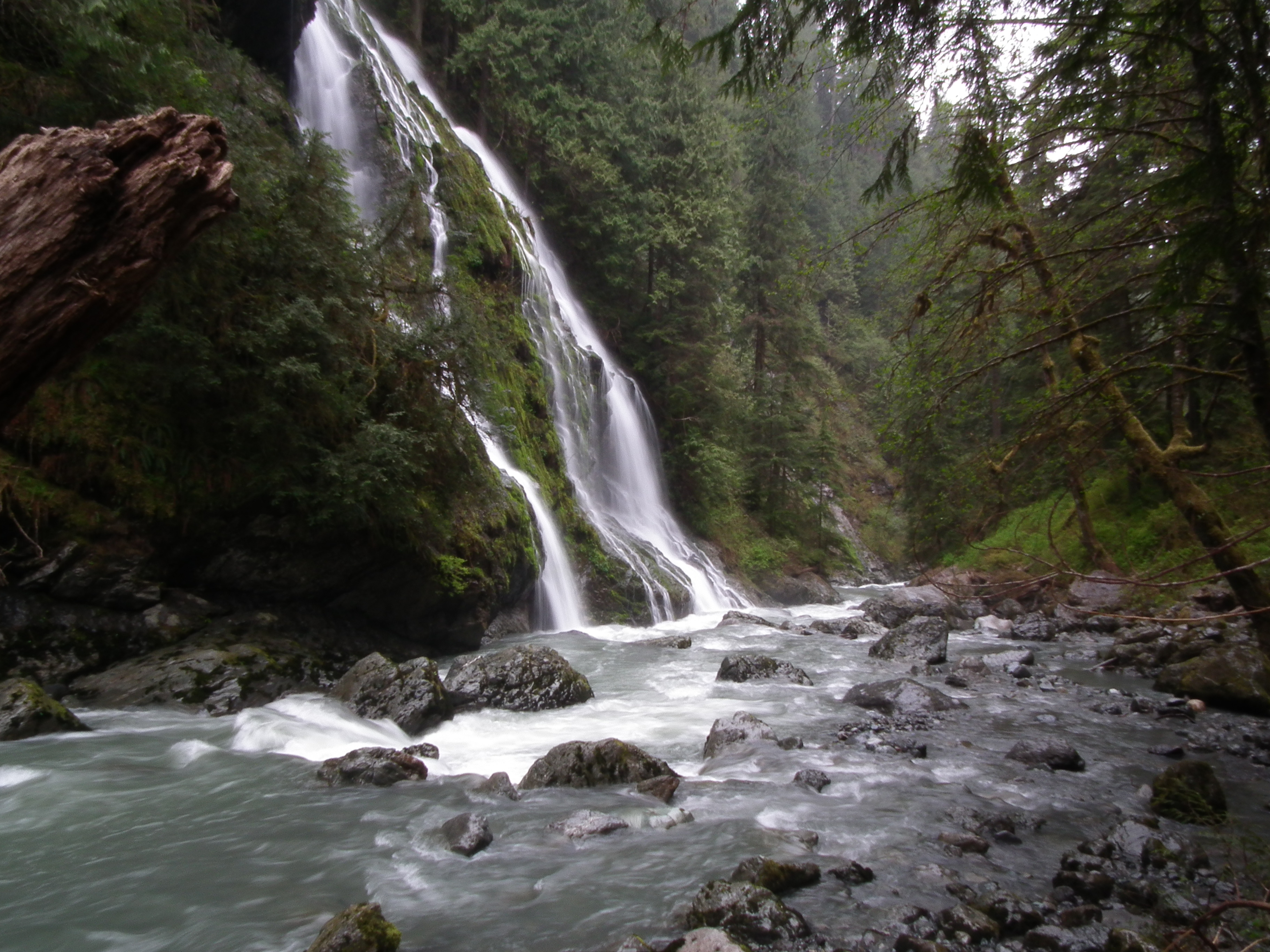
- The lower part of Feature Show Falls
- Interactive map of Feature Show Falls
- Location: Snohomish County, Washington, U.S.
- Type: Segmented
- Total height: 180 feet (55 m)
- Number of drops: 1
- Total width: 35 feet (11 m)
- Watercourse: Unnamed

Feature Show Falls is a waterfall on an unnamed tributary of the Boulder River in Washington, United States. It is a segmented 180-foot (55 m) drop that is about 35 feet (11 m) wide at its base. The falls drop directly into the Boulder River.

Feature Show Falls is often confused with Boulder Falls, which occurs on the river about 2/3 of a mile downstream from Feature Show Falls. Most people come to Feature Show Falls and think it is Boulder Falls because Boulder Falls is marked on most maps and Feature Show is not. Most of them don't realize when they come to this waterfall they have already passed Boulder Falls. To see Boulder falls, one has to actually go off trail a ways before reaching Feature Show Falls and climb down to the river where the falls are.

== See also ==
- Boulder River Wilderness
- Boulder River
