= Davis Slough =

Waterway on the Puget Sound in the state of Washington

Davis Slough is a waterway on Puget Sound in the state of Washington. The slough runs between Camano and Leque islands, connecting Skagit Bay in the north to Port Susan in the south.

The border between Island County and Snohomish County is set at the slough.

State Route 532 crosses Davis Slough via the Davis Slough Bridge, which is the only access to Camano Island from the mainland.

The slough is the site of the Davis Slough Heronry, protected in 2003, one of the most important breeding colonies of great blue heron in the Pacific Northwest.
