= Florence, Washington =

Unincorporated community in Washington, United States

- Unincorporated community
- Location within Washington (state) Location within the United States
- Coordinates: 48°13′14″N 122°19′55″W
- Country: United States
- State: Washington
- County: Snohomish
- Time zone: UTC-8 (Pacific (PST))
  - Summer (DST): UTC-7 (PDT)

Florence is an unincorporated community in Snohomish County, in the U.S. state of Washington. It's located on Florence Island in the Stillaguamish River delta.

== History ==
A post office called Florence was established in 1884, and remained in operation until 1949. The community was platted in 1866 and named after the love interest of an early postmaster.

During its heyday, Florence had several hotels, bars and restaurants, as well as a stagecoach line and dock for sternwheelers. Florence eventually lost out to nearby Stanwood as the area's main center of commerce.
