= Queest-alb Glacier =

Glacier in Washington, United States

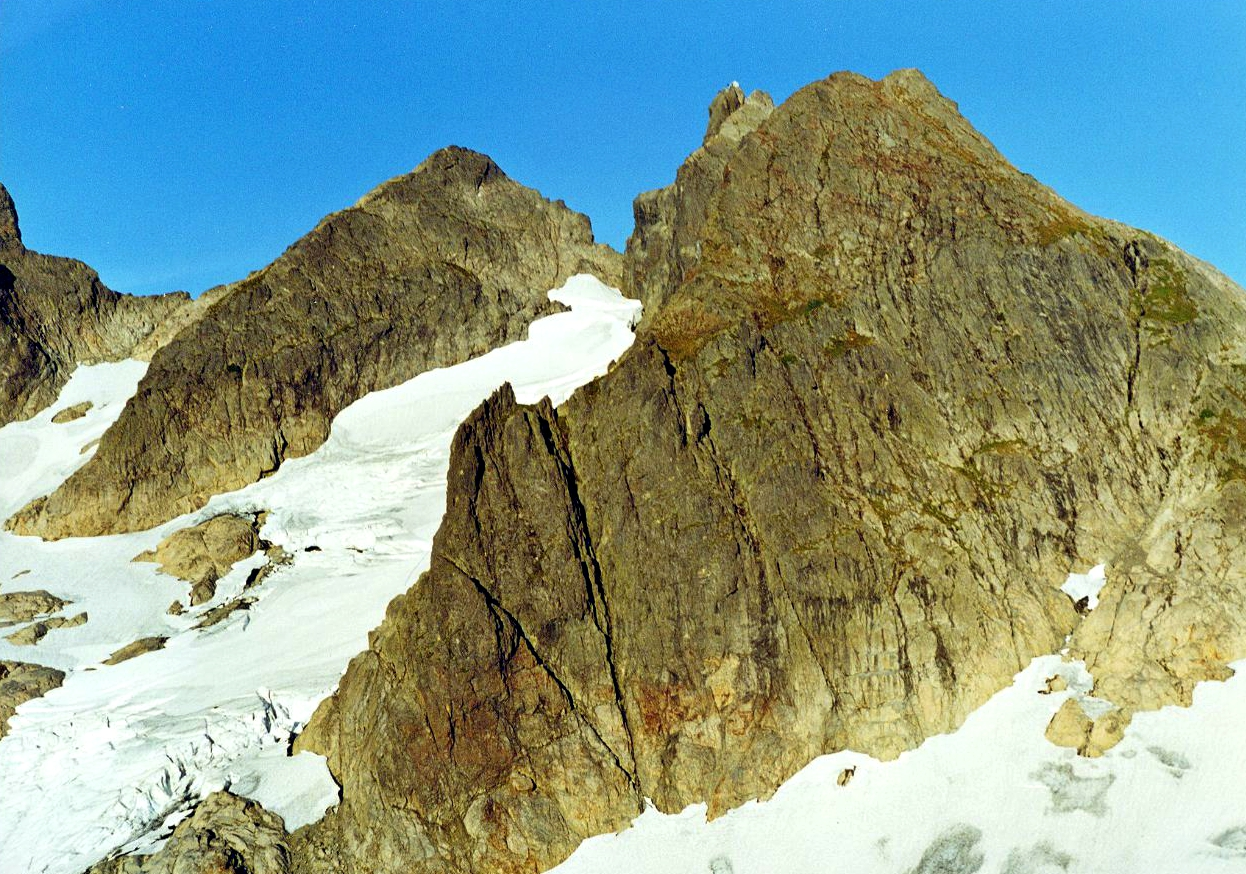

- Location within Washington (state)
- Type: Cirque glacier
- Location: Snohomish County, Washington, U.S.
- Coordinates: 48°10′12″N 121°41′56″W
- Length: .60 mi (0.97 km)
- Terminus: Barren rock
- Status: Retreating

Queest-alb Glacier is in Snoqualmie National Forest in the U.S. state of Washington, on the west slopes of Three Fingers. Queest-alb Glacier is also known as Three Fingers Glacier, but neither name is officially recognized by the United States Geological Survey. The glacier descends from 6,400 to 5,000 ft (2,000 to 1,500 m).

== See also ==
- List of glaciers in the United States
