= Boulder River (Washington) =

River in Washington

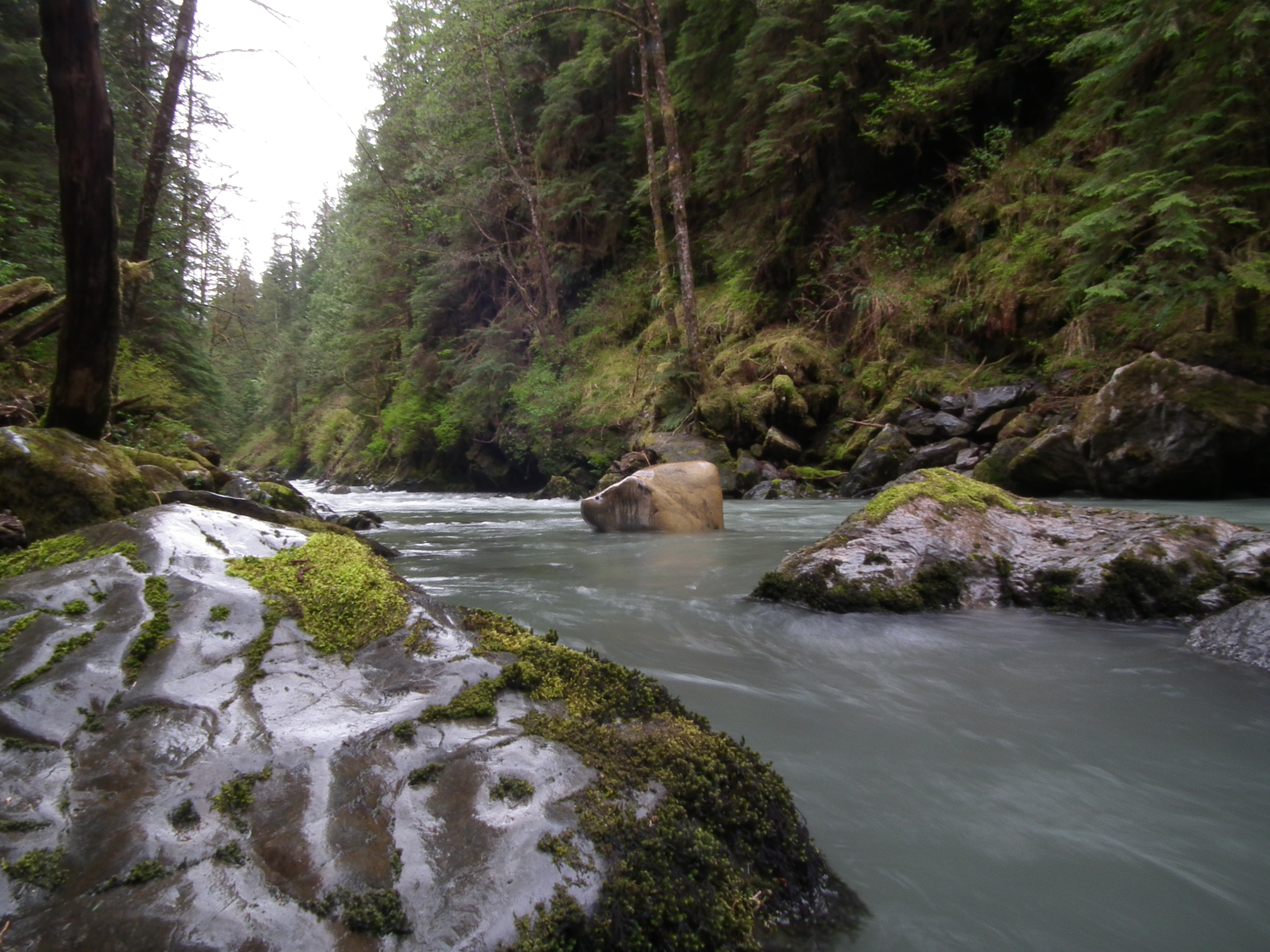
- Rampage jackson River

- Location of the mouth of the Boulder River in Washington Boulder River (Washington) (the United States)

Location
- Country: United States
- State: Washington
- Region: Snohomish County

Physical characteristics
- Source: Craig Lakes
  - coordinates: 48°11′14″N 121°41′53″W
  - elevation: 3,888 ft (1,185 m)
- Mouth: Stillaguamish River
  - coordinates: 48°16′55″N 121°47′15″W
  - elevation: 325 ft (99 m)
- Length: 14 mi (23 km)

The Boulder River is a river in the U.S. state of Washington.

== Course ==
The Boulder River originates in the Cascade Range, from the slopes of Three Fingers, Mount Bullen, and Whitehorse Mountain. It flows northwest and then northeast through a portion of Boulder River Wilderness to join the Stillaguamish River. The Stillaguamish empties into Port Susan, part of Puget Sound. The river's source is the Craig Lakes, two remote lakes located high on the slopes of Three Fingers. After exiting the lakes the river plunges over Craig Lakes Falls as it descends into the Boulder River Wilderness.

The river flows northwest from there and just as it is turning northeast it tumbles over very bouldery Boulder Falls. The river also flows over one more waterfall, Half Mile Falls, before the river makes its final push toward its confluence with the North Fork Stillaguamish River.

== Tributaries ==
- Gerkman Creek
  - Ditney Creek

== See also ==
- List of rivers of Washington (state)
- Boulder River Waterfalls
- Boulder River Wilderness
