= Mark Clark Bridge =

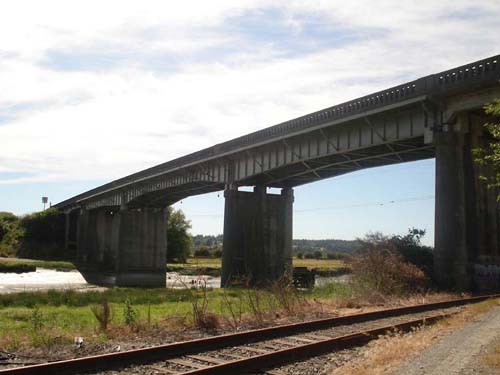
- Coordinates: 48.240266°N 122.383189°W
- Carries: SR 532
- Crosses: Stillaguamish River
- Locale: Stanwood, Washington
- Maintained by: Washington State Department of Transportation

Characteristics
- Design: Girder bridge
- Material: Concrete, steel
- Total length: 487 feet (148 m)

History
- Opened: July 23, 1950
- Closed: August 17, 2010

Location
- Interactive map of Mark Clark Bridge

The Mark Clark Bridge was a girder bridge that carried a State Route 532 across the Stillaguamish River between Stanwood, Washington, and Camano Island. It was the only form of road access to Camano Island from 1950 until 2010, when it was demolished. The bridge was named for Mark W. Clark, a U.S. Army officer who spent time on Camano Island. The water surrounding Camano Island is too shallow for ferry service, which made this bridge a critical link for island residents and visitors.

The bridge replaced an earlier swing bridge that opened in 1909 and was part of the first highway between Stanwood and Camano Island. Shortly after the highway was incorporated into the state highway system in 1945, a $615,000 replacement was planned by the state government at the request of Stanwood, Camano Island, and the former town of East Stanwood. It was dedicated on July 23, 1950, and was connected to a new highway bypassing Stanwood and East Stanwood.

== Replacement ==
The Washington State Department of Transportation (WSDOT) began construction of a new Stillaguamish River bridge in the summer of 2009. The Mark Clark Bridge was found to be too narrow and vulnerable in the event of a major earthquake.

The new bridge is designed with a width of 56 feet (17 m) to accommodate a four-lane highway, while initially configured for two-lane traffic, and include a wide shoulder for bicyclists and pedestrians.

On August 17, 2010, the new Camano Gateway Bridge opened to traffic. As a result, the Mark Clark bridge was closed to traffic and later demolished.
