= Three Fingers Lookout =

- U.S. National Register of Historic Places
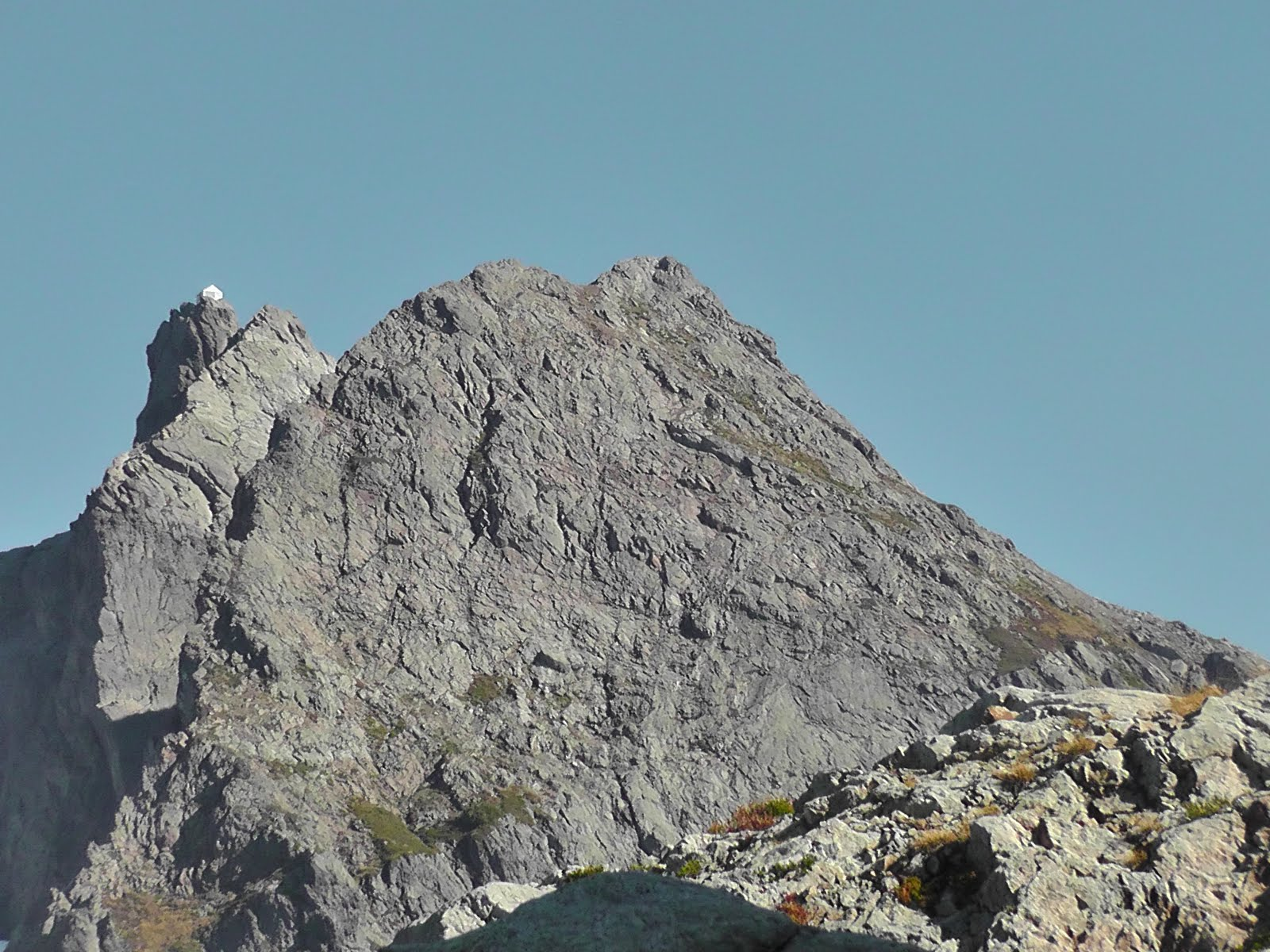
- Lookout is white building on left peak

- Location within Washington (state) Location within the United States
- Location: Darrington Ranger District on the southernmost peak of Three Fingers, Darrington, Washington
- Coordinates: 48°10′12″N 121°41′11″W
- Area: less than one acre
- Built: 1930
- Built by: Engles, Harold; Et al.
- MPS: USDA Forest Service Fire Lookouts on Mt. Baker--Snoqualmie National Forest TR
- NRHP reference No.: 87001190
- Added to NRHP: July 14, 1987

The Three Fingers Lookout is a historic fire observation building on one of the summits of Three Fingers Mountain in Mount Baker-Snoqualmie National Forest, Snohomish County, Washington. Built in 1930 in an extremely challenging location, it is one of the oldest surviving observation posts in the forest. It was listed on the National Register of Historic Places in 1987, and is now maintained by a local climbing group.

== Description and history ==
The Three Fingers are a prominently visible peak in the Darrington Ranger District in central northern Snohomish County. Set on top of the southernmost pinnacles of the peak's eponymous three summits, is a one-room wood frame cabin measuring 14 by 14 feet (4.3 m × 4.3 m). Its wooden floor is bolted directly to the rock, and the structure is further held in place by guy cables attached to nearby rock outcrops. The exterior is finished in wooden clapboards. Windows are either fixed sash or casement, with operable shutters supported by extremely heavy-duty metal parts. The shutters on the south and west faces are not original, those having blown off in the high winds that frequent the setting. The interior is finished in original beadboard paneling on the walls and ceiling. A chain with turnbuckle is mounted at the ceiling level, joining the east and west walls as a means to strengthen the building against lateral wind forces. The exterior is also fitted with a lightning protection system.

The lookout was built over a three-year period between 1930 and 1932 by Harold Engles and Fred Benesh. Engles and Harry Bedal had first scaled the peak in 1929, to investigate its feasibility as a fire observation site, given its visual prominence. The site was prepared by blasting 15 feet (4.6 m) off the top of the pinnacle to create a level foundation. Construction materials were brought by pack animals to within 600 feet (180 m) of the summit, and transported via a tram system to the work site, which was accessed by a series of ropes and ladders. The building is a nearly standard example of an L-4 Forest Service lookout, lacking only an outside catwalk due to the site geography. Engles and Benesh had originally planned to place a smaller D-5 lookout, a 12 by 12 feet (3.7 m × 3.7 m) structure that was standard until 1929. The building is one of two gable-roofed L-4 models still standing in Mount Baker-Snoqualmie National Forest.

The building was staffed seasonally between 1933 and 1942, and was then abandoned for financial reasons. Everett Mountaineers, a local mountaineering group, has taken over its maintenance.

The roof was replaced in 2015 using materials delivered via helicopter by the Snohomish County Sheriff's Office. Major repairs were completed in 2021 by the volunteer group Friends of Three Fingers Lookout, including replacement of broken windows and shutters.

== See also ==
- National Register of Historic Places listings in Snohomish County, Washington
