= Florence Island (Washington) =

Island in Washington, U.S.

Coordinates: 48°13′15″N 122°21′0″W

Florence Island is the main island formed by the diked river delta of the Stillaguamish River as it flows into Port Susan on Puget Sound.

The historic Snohomish County settlement of Florence is located on the delta and gives the island its name. Florence Island is connected to the mainland by three bridges heading in the directions of Stanwood to the north, Silvana and Arlington to the east, and Warm Beach to the south.

== Bridges ==
=== Old Thomle Bridge ===
A truss bridge carried the main vehicular traffic over the Stilliguamish river between Stanwood and Florence. It was replaced by the current bridge in 1959 but remained open for local access for two decades. The bridge was closed to traffic in 1979 after the county determined rebuilding the bridge would be too costly. The bridge itself was removed and salvaged in November 1979.

== Estuary restoration ==
In 2022, the Stillaguamish Tribe of Indians was awarded a $4.9 million grant to restore chinook salmon habitat in the Stillaguamish delta. The project involves creating a 230 acre estuary from previously diked farmland south of Boe Road on Florence Island.
