= Verlot, Washington =

- CDP
- Location of Verlot, Washington
- Coordinates: 48°5′9″N 121°45′46″W
- Country: United States
- State: Washington
- County: Snohomish

Area
  - Total: 6.5 sq mi (16.8 km^{2})
  - Land: 6.4 sq mi (16.5 km^{2})
  - Water: 0.15 sq mi (0.4 km^{2})
- Elevation: 965 ft (294 m)

Population (2020)
  - Total: 340
  - Density: 53/sq mi (21/km^{2})
- Time zone: UTC-8 (Pacific (PST))
  - Summer (DST): UTC-7 (PDT)
- ZIP Code: 98252
- Area code(s): 360, 564
- FIPS code: 53-74760
- GNIS feature ID: 1527699

Verlot is a census-designated place (CDP) in Snohomish County, Washington, United States. The population was 340 at the 2020 census.

== Geography ==
According to the United States Census Bureau, the CDP has a total area of 6.5 square miles (16.8 km^{2}), of which, 6.4 square miles (16.5 km^{2}) of it is land and 0.1 square miles (0.4 km^{2}) of it (2.15%) is water.

== Demographics ==
Historical population
Census	Pop.	Note	%±
2000	170		—
2010	285		67.6%
2020	340		19.3%
U.S. Decennial Census; 1970 1980 1990; 2000 2010

Verlot first appeared as a census designated place in the 2000 U.S. census.

=== Racial and ethnic composition ===
Verlot CDP, Washington – Racial and ethnic composition Note: the US Census treats Hispanic/Latino as an ethnic category. This table excludes Latinos from the racial categories and assigns them to a separate category. Hispanics/Latinos may be of any race.
Race / Ethnicity (NH = Non-Hispanic)	Pop 2000	Pop 2010	Pop 2020	% 2000	% 2010	% 2020
White alone (NH)	165	257	279	97.06%	90.18%	82.06%
Black or African American alone (NH)	0	2	0	0.00%	0.70%	0.00%
Native American or Alaska Native alone (NH)	1	3	5	0.59%	1.05%	1.47%
Asian alone (NH)	1	2	1	0.59%	0.70%	0.29%
Native Hawaiian or Pacific Islander alone (NH)	0	0	1	0.00%	0.00%	0.29%
Other race alone (NH)	0	0	1	0.00%	0.00%	0.29%
Mixed race or Multiracial (NH)	1	10	26	0.59%	3.51%	7.65%
Hispanic or Latino (any race)	2	11	27	1.18%	3.86%	7.94%
Total	170	285	340	100.00%	100.00%	100.00%

=== 2000 census ===
As of the census of 2000, there were 170 people, 66 households, and 41 families living in the CDP. The population density was 26.7 people per square mile (10.3/km^{2}). There were 96 housing units at an average density of 15.1/sq mi (5.8/km^{2}). The racial makeup of the CDP was 98.24% White, 0.59% Native American, 0.59% Asian, and 0.59% from two or more races. Hispanic or Latino of any race were 1.18% of the population.

There were 66 households, out of which 34.8% had children under the age of 18 living with them, 48.5% were married couples living together, 12.1% had a female householder with no husband present, and 36.4% were non-families. 21.2% of all households were made up of individuals, and 3.0% had someone living alone who was 65 years of age or older. The average household size was 2.58 and the average family size was 3.10.

In the CDP, the age distribution of the population shows 29.4% under the age of 18, 7.1% from 18 to 24, 30.0% from 25 to 44, 26.5% from 45 to 64, and 7.1% who were 65 years of age or older. The median age was 39 years. For every 100 females, there were 100.0 males. For every 100 females age 18 and over, there were 114.3 males.

The median income for a household in the CDP was $29,519, and the median income for a family was $27,692. Males had a median income of $90,957 versus $46,250 for females. The per capita income for the CDP was $13,205. About 20.7% of families and 33.5% of the population were below the poverty line, including 47.1% of those under the age of 18 and 30.0% of those 65 or over.
