= Silvana, Washington =

- CDP
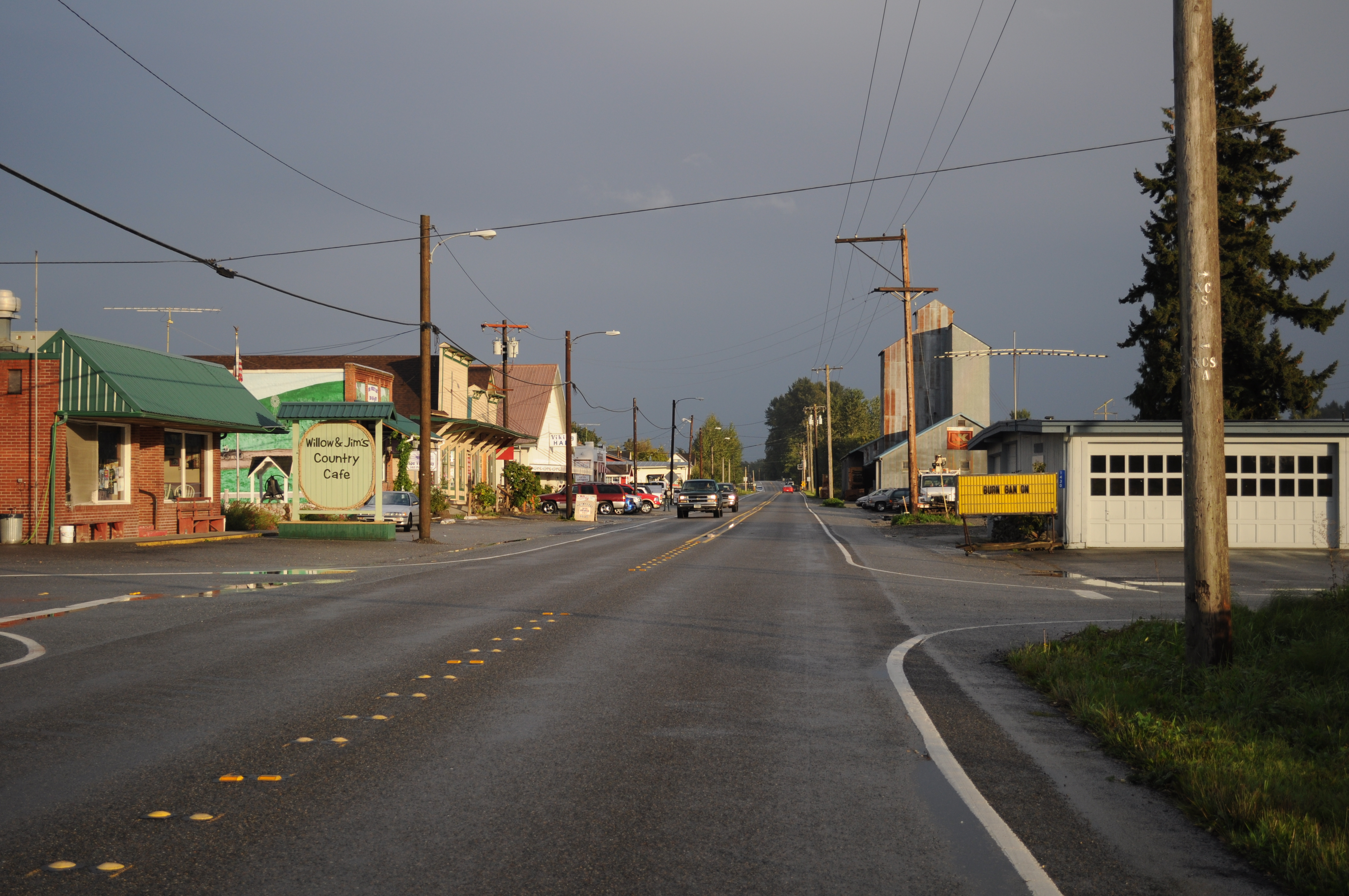

- Location of Silvana, Washington
- Coordinates: 48°12′8″N 122°15′19″W
- Country: United States
- State: Washington
- County: Snohomish

Area
  - Total: 1.5 sq mi (4.0 km^{2})
  - Land: 1.5 sq mi (4.0 km^{2})
  - Water: 0 sq mi (0.0 km^{2})
- Elevation: 30 ft (9 m)

Population (2020)
  - Total: 97
  - Density: 63/sq mi (24/km^{2})
- Time zone: UTC-8 (Pacific (PST))
  - Summer (DST): UTC-7 (PDT)
- ZIP Code: 98287
- Area code: 360, 564
- FIPS code: 53-64190
- GNIS feature ID: 1512660

Silvana is a rural community and census-designated place (CDP) in Snohomish County, Washington, United States. Its population was 97 at the 2020 census.

== Geography ==
Silvana is located on Silvana Island in the Stillaguamish River floodplain. The name of the island is Silvana Island, an island east of Florence Island. The main channel of the river passes to the north of Silvana Island, while South Slough to the southwest and Cook Slough to the southeast also form the general boundaries of the community. It is located at 48°12′8″N 122°15′19″W (48.202307, -122.255315). According to the United States Census Bureau, the CDP has a total area of 1.5 square miles (4.0 km^{2}), all of it land.

== Demographics ==
Historical population
Census	Pop.	Note	%±
2000	97		—
2010	90		−7.2%
2020	97		7.8%
U.S. Decennial Census; 1970 1980 1990; 2000 2010

Silvana first appeared as a census designated place in the 2000 U.S. census.

=== Racial and ethnic composition ===
Silvana CDP, Washington – Racial and ethnic composition Note: the US Census treats Hispanic/Latino as an ethnic category. This table excludes Latinos from the racial categories and assigns them to a separate category. Hispanics/Latinos may be of any race.
Race / Ethnicity (NH = Non-Hispanic)	Pop 2000	Pop 2010	Pop 2020	% 2000	% 2010	% 2020
White alone (NH)	89	81	81	91.75%	90.00%	83.51%
Black or African American alone (NH)	0	0	0	0.00%	0.00%	0.00%
Native American or Alaska Native alone (NH)	2	2	1	2.06%	2.22%	1.03%
Asian alone (NH)	0	0	0	0.00%	0.00%	0.00%
Native Hawaiian or Pacific Islander alone (NH)	0	0	0	0.00%	0.00%	0.00%
Other race alone (NH)	0	0	0	0.00%	0.00%	0.00%
Mixed race or Multiracial (NH)	0	3	6	0.00%	3.33%	6.19%
Hispanic or Latino (any race)	6	4	9	6.19%	4.44%	9.28%
Total	97	90	97	100.00%	100.00%	100.00%

=== 2000 census ===
As of the census of 2000, there were 97 people, 38 households, and 27 families residing in the CDP. The population density was 63.2 people per square mile (24.3/km^{2}). There were 42 housing units at an average density of 27.4/sq mi (10.5/km^{2}). The racial makeup of the CDP was 93.81% White, 2.06% Native American, 4.12% from other races. Hispanic or Latino of any race were 6.19% of the population.

There were 38 households, out of which 31.6% had children under the age of 18 living with them, 52.6% were married couples living together, 10.5% had a female householder with no husband present, and 28.9% were non-families. 15.8% of all households were made up of individuals, and 5.3% had someone living alone who was 65 years of age or older. The average household size was 2.55, the average family size was 2.96.

In the CDP, the age distribution of the population shows 22.7% under the age of 18, 6.2% from 18 to 24, 36.1% from 25 to 44, 27.8% from 45 to 64, and 7.2% who were 65 years of age or older. The median age was 38 years.

The median income for a household in the CDP was $33,274, and the median income for a family was $33,810. Males had a median income of $68,750 versus $25,655 for females. The per capita income for the CDP was $21,070. None of the population or families were below the poverty line.

== Education ==
The community is served by the Arlington School District.

== Notable people ==
- Nels Bruseth, forest ranger, artist, and naturalist

== Gallery ==
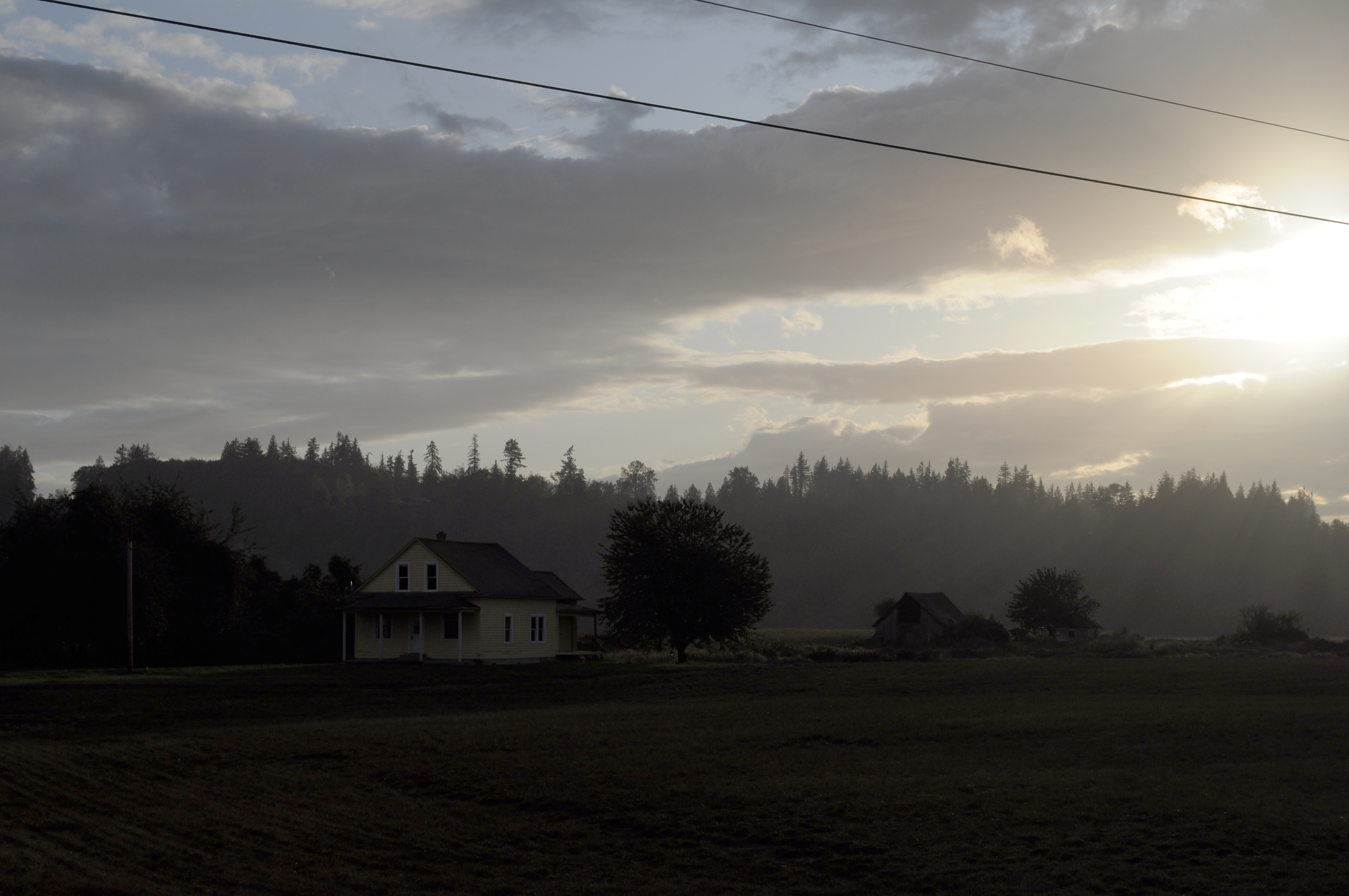
Silvana countryside.

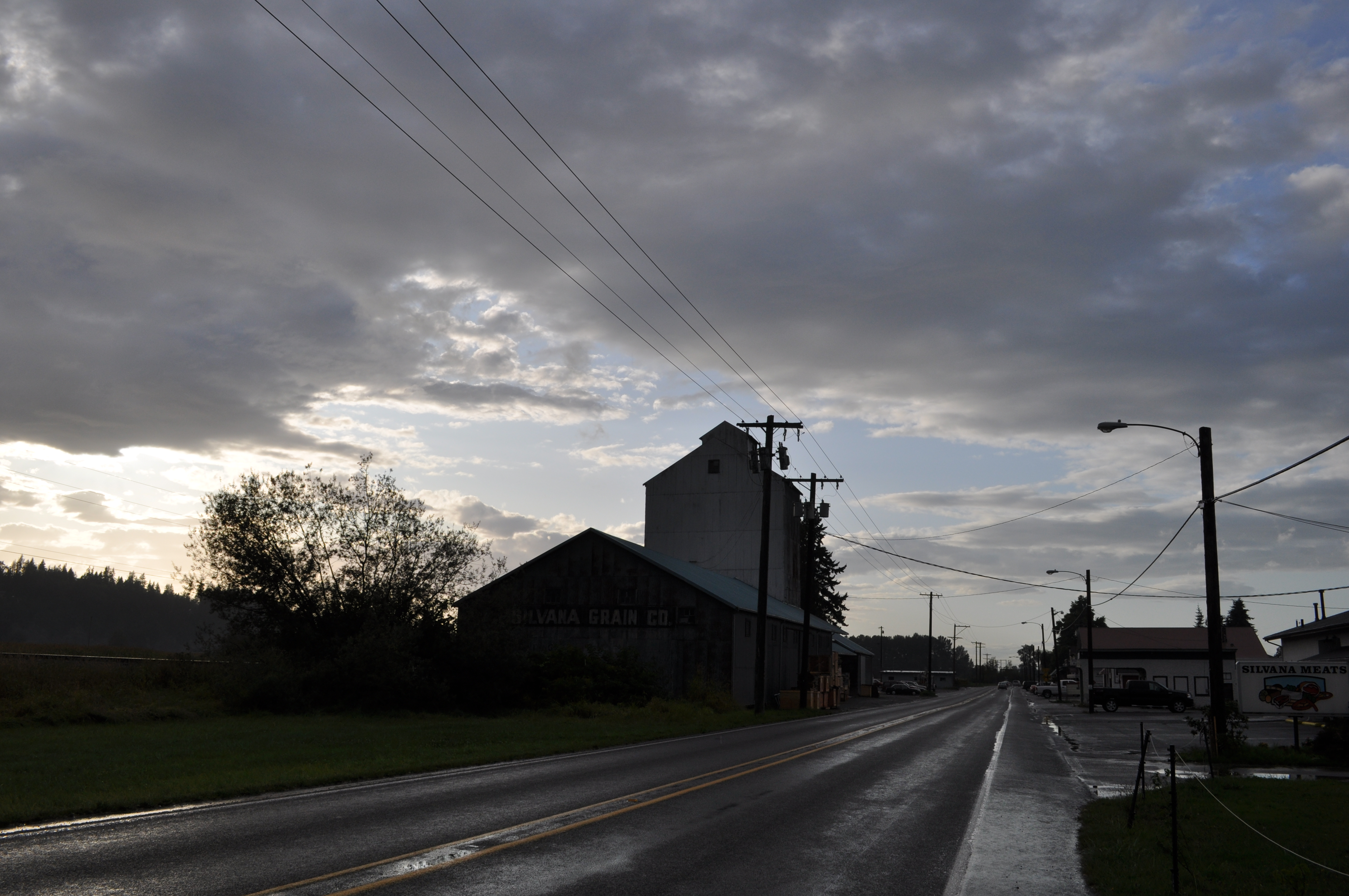
Approaching the center of Silvana from the south. Silvana Grain Co. at left.

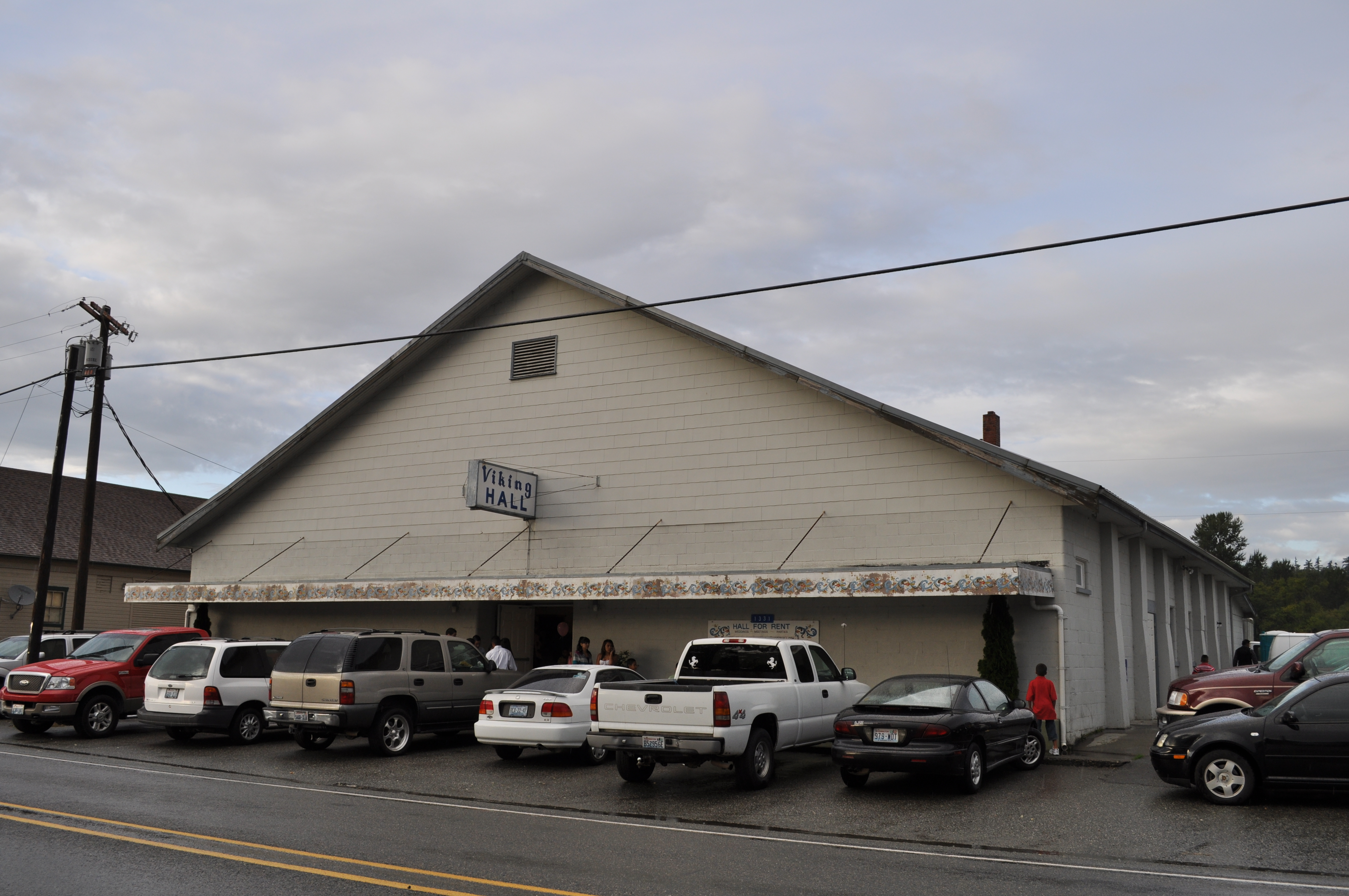
Viking Hall, formerly owned by the Sons of Norway, now a community facility.

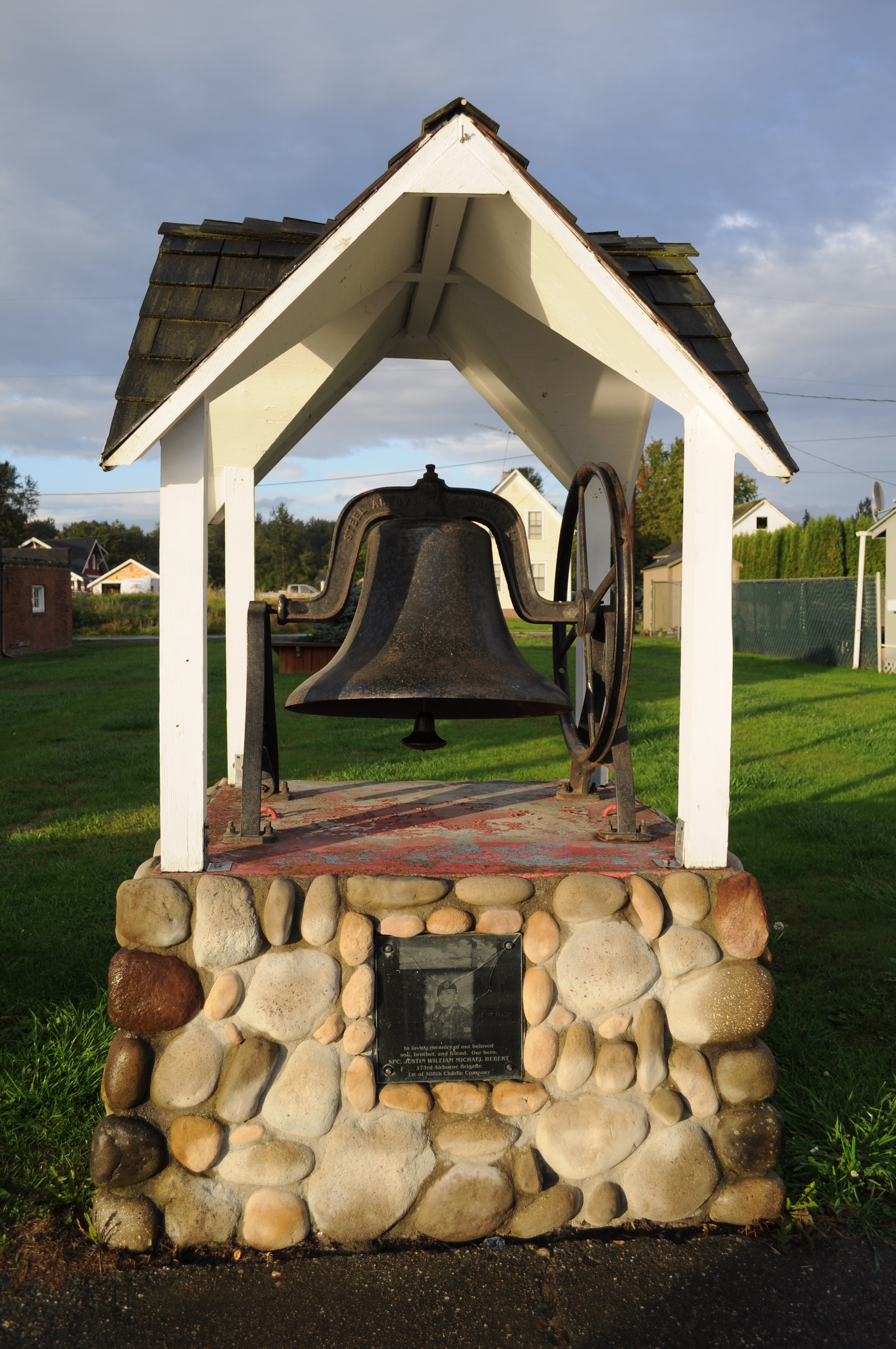
Memorial to Justin W. M. Hebert, a local soldier killed in Iraq in 2003.
