= Boulder River Wilderness =

Protected area in Washington state, U.S.

- IUCN category Ib (wilderness area)
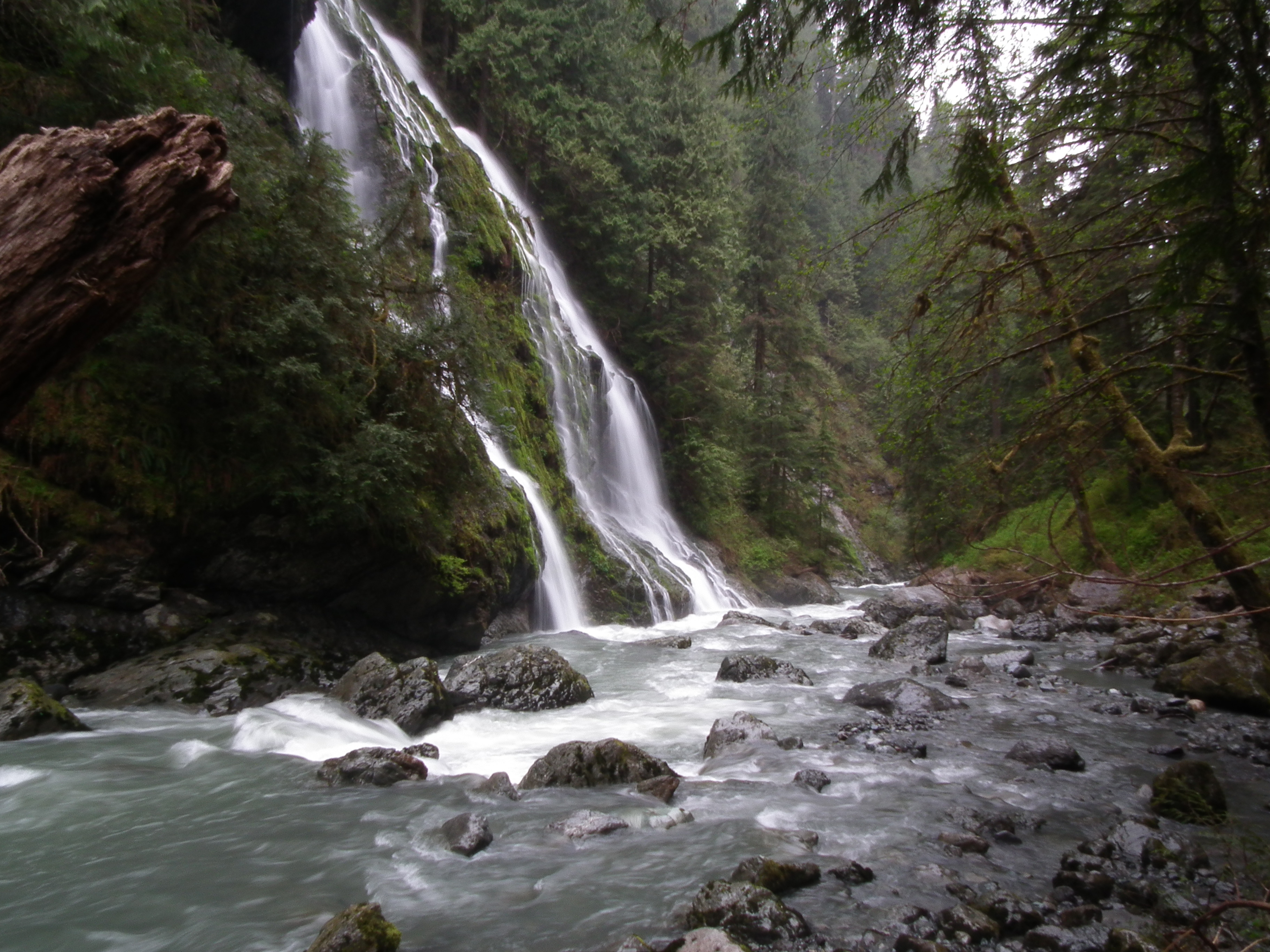

- Location within the United States Location within Washington (state)
- Location: Snohomish County, Washington, US
- Nearest city: Darrington, Washington
- Coordinates: 48°13′30″N 121°48′30″W
- Area: 48,674 acres (197.0 km^{2})
- Established: 1984
- Governing body: U.S. Forest Service

Boulder River Wilderness is a 48,674-acre (197 km^{2}) wilderness area within the Mount Baker-Snoqualmie National Forest in the western Cascade Range of Washington state.

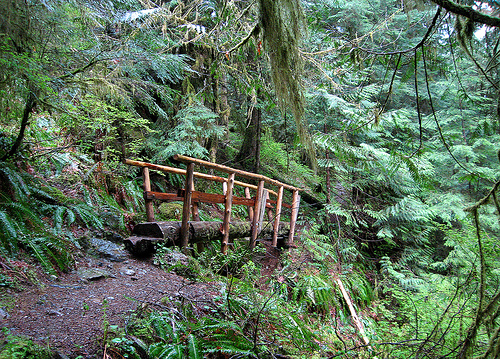
Bridge on the Boulder River Trail in Boulder River Wilderness

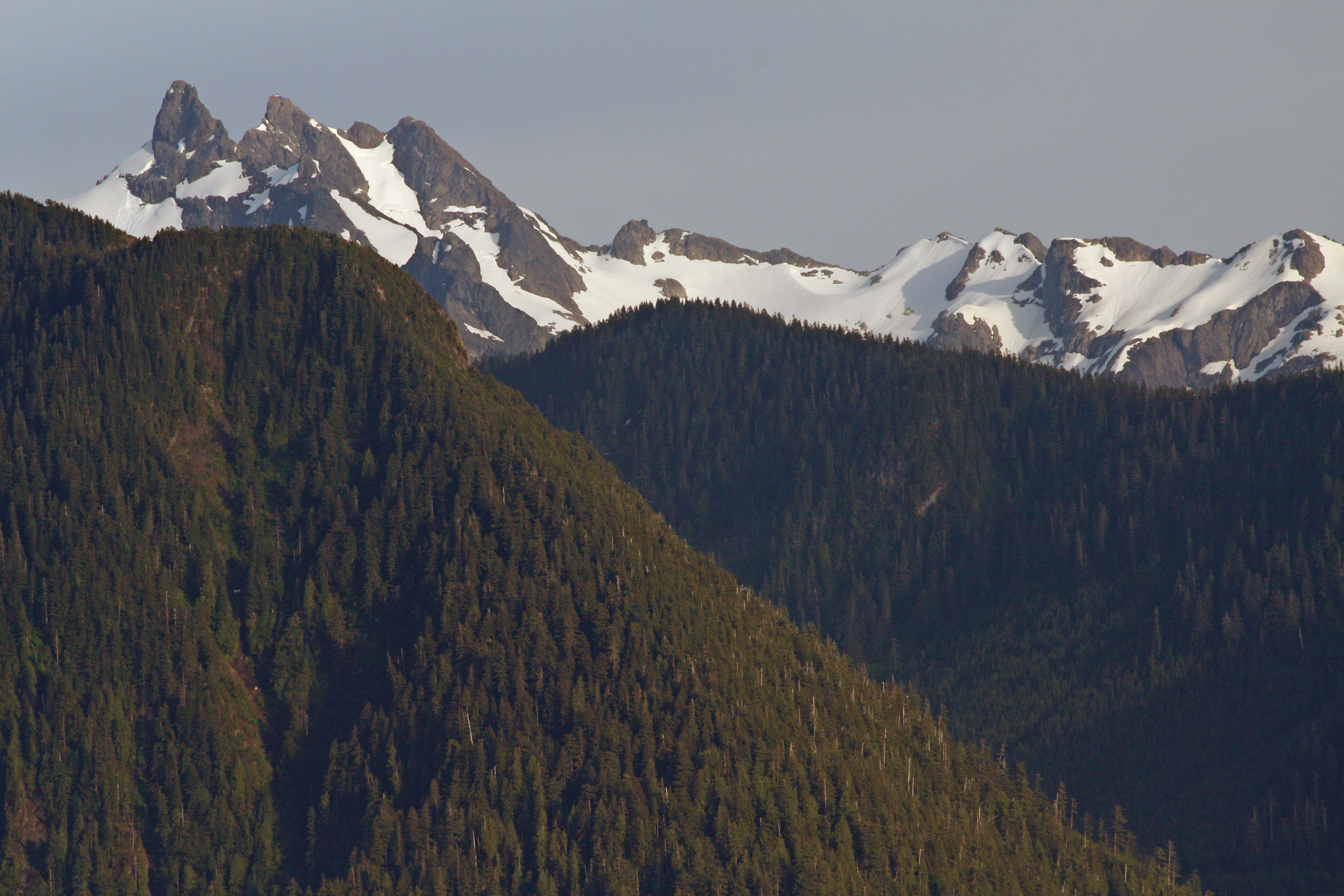
Three Fingers, the highest mountain in the wilderness, with Boulder Ridge in the foreground

== Topography ==
Boulder River Wilderness is made up of dense forests and steep ridges that rise to the summits of Three Fingers and Whitehorse Mountain. Elevations range from 1,000 feet (305 m) in the Boulder River Valley to the 6,850 feet (2,088 m) south peak of Three Fingers. South Peak is also home to an old fire lookout. This high ridge bears a narrow saw-toothed profile with several sharp summits, which include Liberty, Big Bear, and Whitehorse Mountains and Salish and Buckeye Peaks, all above 5,600 feet (1,707 m) in elevation. Several steep and heavily wooded ridges thrust out east and west from the central crest of the wilderness.

Boulder River, a tributary to the North Fork Stillaguamish River, is the wilderness area's primary drainage and runs approximately 10 miles (16 km) through the northwest section of the wilderness. The Long Creek Research Natural Area on the south slope of Wiley Ridge is also protected within the wilderness boundary.

== Vegetation ==
Common vegetation in Boulder River Wilderness includes old-growth Douglas fir, true fir, western hemlock, and western red cedar, as well as bigleaf maple, alder, willow, and devil's club. Sitka spruce can be found at the lowest elevations along the Boulder River. The Boulder River Wilderness contains some of the last substantials tracts of lowland virgin forest in Washington state.

== Wildlife ==
Black bears, black-tailed deer, and elk inhabit the forest, and mountain goats can be found on the rocky shelves above the tree line.

== Hiking ==
Boulder River Wilderness boasts approximately 25 miles (40 km) of trails, though the central core of the area remains rough and trailless. A short trail extends up Boulder River for 4.3 miles (7 km) through old-growth forest. Three short trails climb toward the high crest and eventually peter out. Another trail crosses the northeast corner of the Wilderness over Squire Creek Pass, with outstanding views of the high crest.

== See also ==
- List of U.S. Wilderness Areas
- List of old-growth forests
