= Stillaguamish River =

River in Washington, United States

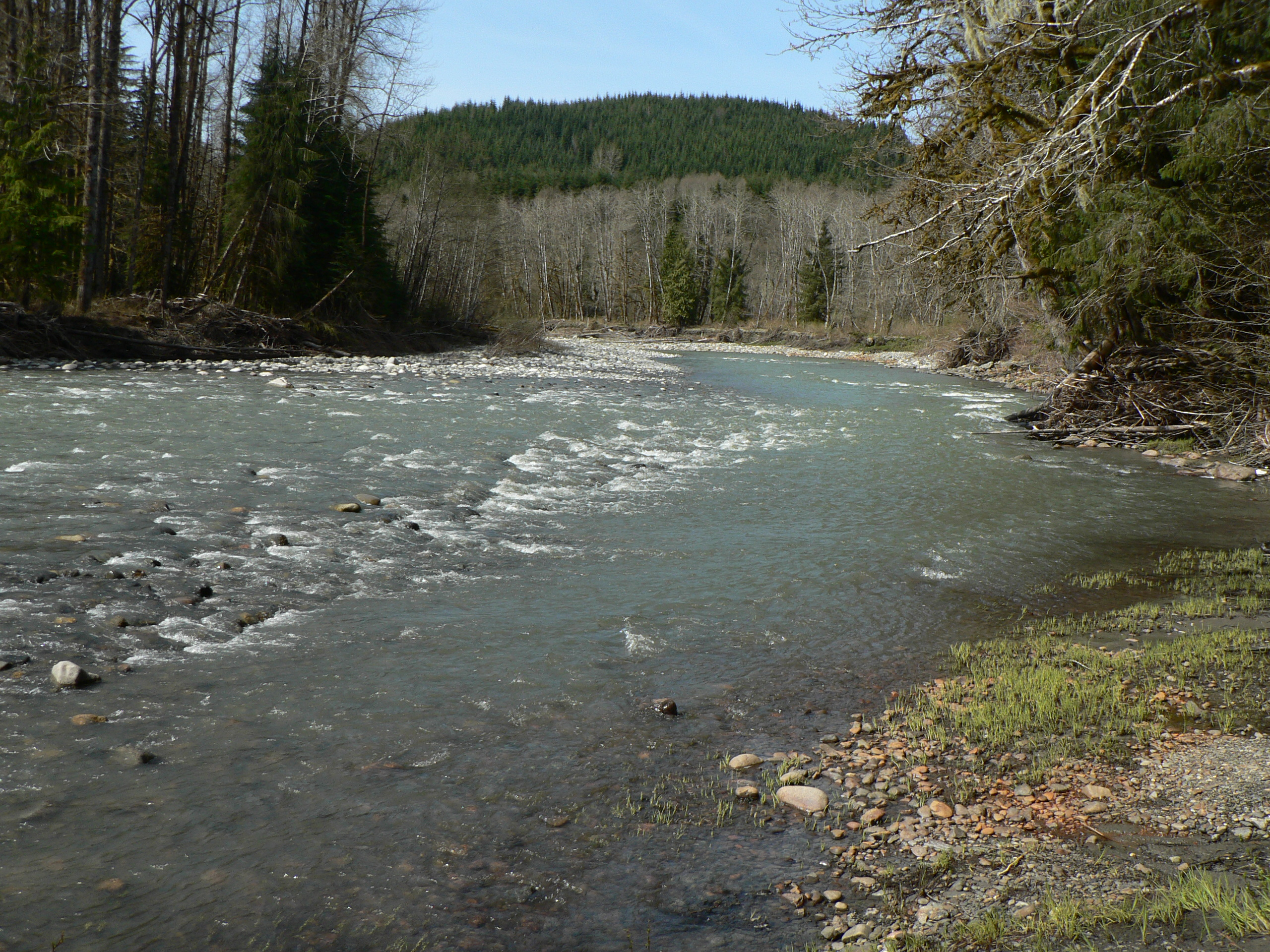
- The South Fork of the Stillaguamish River near Verlot

- Location of the mouth of the Stillaguamish River in Washington Stillaguamish River (the United States)

Location
- Country: United States
- State: Washington

Physical characteristics
- Source: North Cascades
  - coordinates: 48°12′14″N 122°7′38″W
- Mouth: Puget Sound
  - location: Port Susan
  - coordinates: 48°14′18″N 122°22′38″W
  - elevation: 0 m (0 ft)
- Length: 67 mi (108 km)
- Basin size: 700 sq mi (1,800 km^{2})

The Stillaguamish River is a river in the northwestern region of the U.S. state of Washington. It is mainly composed of two forks, the longer North Fork Stillaguamish (45 miles (72 km)) and the South Fork Stillaguamish. The two forks join near Arlington. From there the Stillaguamish River proper flows for 22 miles (35 km) to Puget Sound. The river's watershed drains part of the Cascade Range north of Seattle.

== Name ==
The Stillaguamish River's name is derived from the Stillaguamish people, the Lushootseed-speaking people who had several villages along the river's course. Their name, Stillaguamish, is derived from their Lushootseed endonym, stuləgʷabš, meaning "river people."

Variant spellings of the Stillaguamish River, according to the USGS, include Stoh-luk-whahmpsh River, Steilaguamish River, and Stalukahamish River.

== Course ==
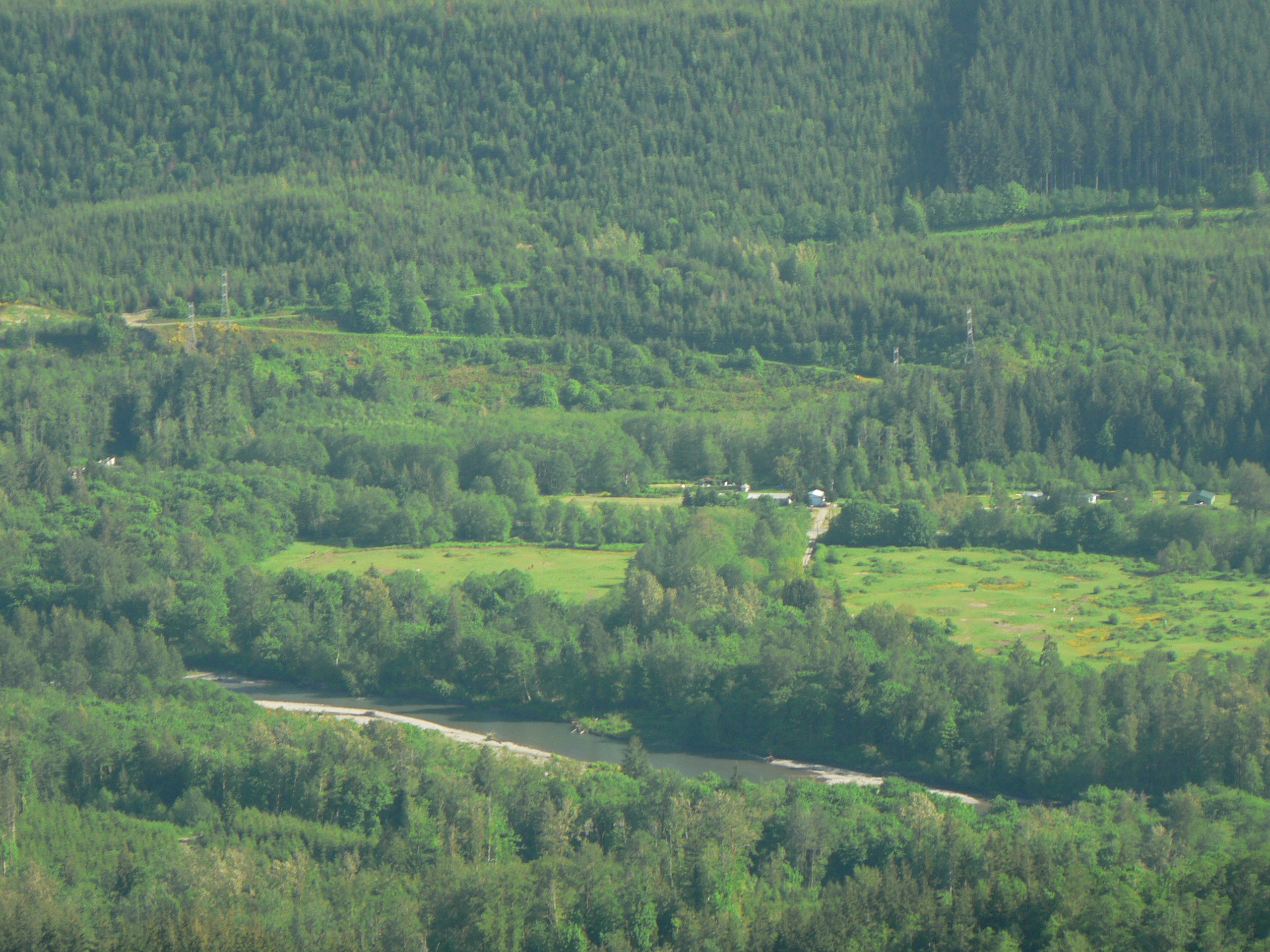
North Fork Valley west of Darrington

The Stillaguamish River is formed from the confluence of the North and South Forks, both of which rise in the Cascades. Between the North and South forks there is a portion of the Mount Baker-Snoqualmie National Forest called the Boulder River Wilderness.

The North Fork rises as several branches in a remote area of Skagit County near Finney Peak, approximately 10 miles (16 km) north of Darrington. Collecting many tributary creeks, the river flows south, then west through the foothills along the Skagit-Snohomish county line. Tributaries of the North Fork Stillaguamish River include Boulder River and Deer Creek.

The South Fork (30 miles (48 km)) originates from the northern slopes of Del Campo Peak and Morning Star Peak in central Snohomish County, 20 miles (32 km) south of Darrington, and flows west and northwest by Silverton, Verlot, and Granite Falls.

The two forks unite at Arlington in northwestern Snohomish County. The combined stream flows west before it briefly splits again to encircle the town of Silvana.

The Stillaguamish bifurcates at its delta to form Florence Island before entering Puget Sound. Hatt Slough flows southwest and is now the primary distributary of the Stillaguamish waters into Port Susan, having been diverted in the early twentieth century. The Old Stillaguamish River Channel flows northwest towards Florence and then Stanwood on an 8-mile meandering course. Near the Camano Island bridge this channel again splits, forming Leque Island, with the South Pass flowing into Port Susan and the West Pass emptying into the southern end of Skagit Bay.

== Natural history ==
The Stillaguamish River and its tributaries are known for their salmon runs. Eight salmonid species use the streams for spawning, including Chinook, coho, chum, pink, and sockeye salmon, steelhead trout, sea-run cutthroat, and bull trout.

== Hydrology ==
The north fork of the Stillaguamish river level is monitored by gauges operated by the United States Geological Survey (USGS), and river levels can vary by as much as 13 feet (4.0 m). The river level rises and falls very quickly, with the average north fork flood duration of eight hours. Of the five highest north fork flood levels on record, three have occurred since 2009.

== History ==
The Stillaguamish River is the center of Stillaguamish territory. For centuries, the Stillaguamish have fished and hunted and gathered all along its extent. The Stillaguamish had at least ten villages along its course, from its mouth to as far upriver as Hazel and Mt. Higgins (Lushootseed: sx̌ədəlwaʔs). Other Indigenous peoples historically traveled to the Stillaguamish River to fish as well, including the Sauk, the Snohomish, and the Duwamish. Since 2011, the Stillaguamish Tribe of Indians has purchased more than 2,000 acres (810 ha) of land on the river, removing and replacing levees and digging channels to restore the original marshland and estuaries near the river's mouth. This restoration is intended to reduce flooding risks and improve habitats for Chinook salmon. One new wetland created in collaboration with ecologists from the University of Washington is the 230 acres (93 ha) called the zis a ba wetland, named for a Stillaguamish chief of a village near the mouth of the Stillaguamish River.

The 2014 Oso landslide occurred on the North Fork of the Stillaguamish.

On December 5, 2023, the river crested at 21.34 feet (6.50 m) near Arlington and set a new record amid regional floods.

== See also ==
- List of Washington rivers
