= Three Fingers (Washington) =

Mountain in Washington (state), United States

- sgʷistalb (Lushootseed)
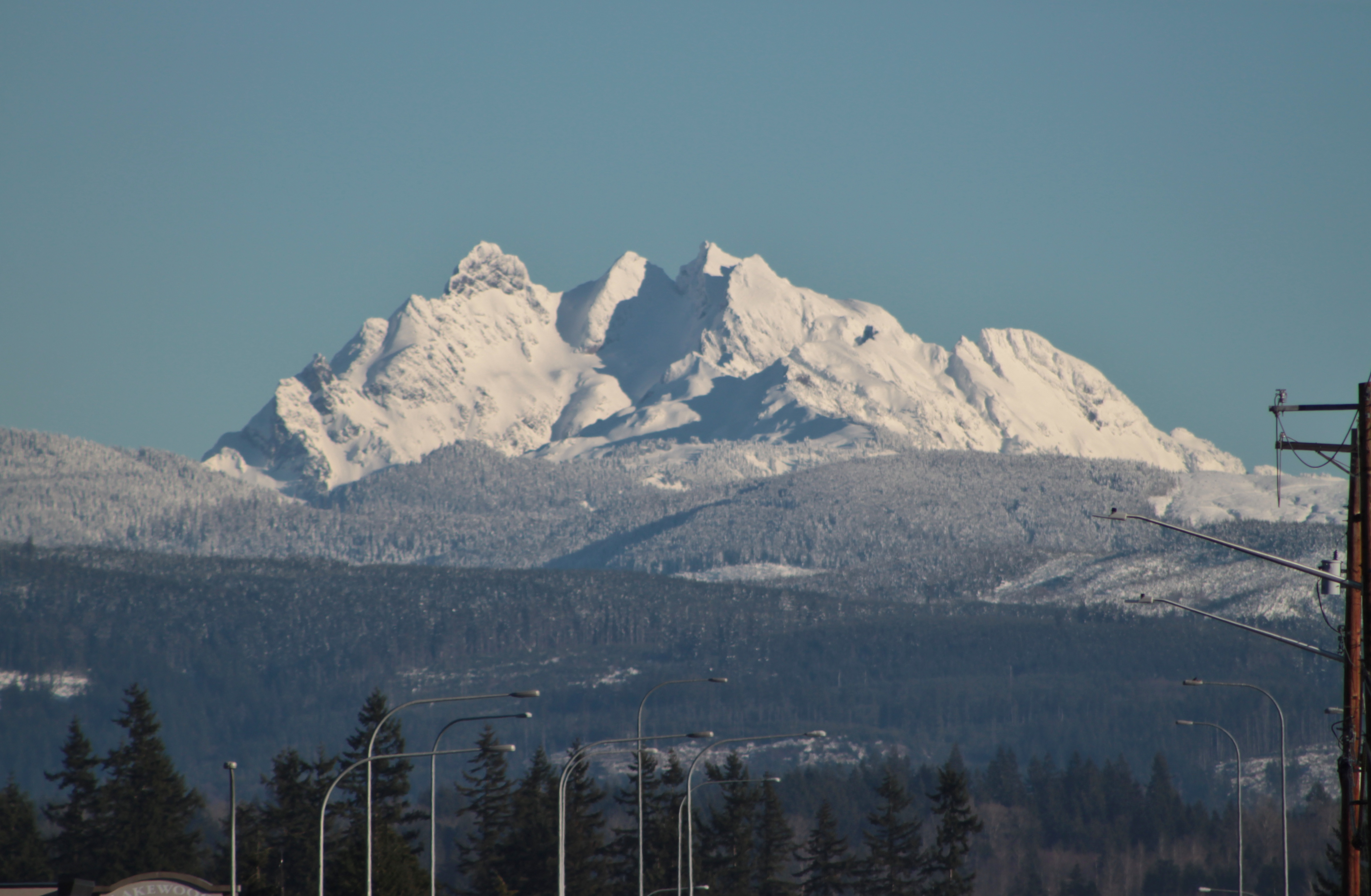
- Three Fingers, viewed from Smokey Point in wintertime

Highest point
- Elevation: 6,858 ft (2,090 m)
- Prominence: 4,490 ft (1,369 m)
- Isolation: 12.8 mi (20.6 km)
- Coordinates: 48°10′12″N 121°41′16″W

Geography
- Parent range: Cascade Range
- Topo map: Whitehorse Mountain

Climbing
- First ascent: 1929

The Three Fingers (Lushootseed: sgʷistalb) is a mountain which is located in Snohomish County, Washington. At a height of 6,859 feet (2,091 m), it is the 12th most prominent peak of the state, and is also part of the Cascade Range. The name "Three Fingers" refers to the mountain's three summits. The Three Fingers is a prominent and recognizable landmark in northern Snohomish County.

The first ascent of the mountain came in 1929, by Darrington-based mountaineers Harry Bedal and Harold Engles. A fire lookout was built on the southernmost peak by Bedal, Engels, and Frank Benesh, and was seasonally staffed from 1933 until 1942. Supposedly, the top 15 feet (4.6 m) of the southern peak was blasted for the cabin, lowering the mountain's height in the process. It was abandoned and later rebuilt by local mountaineering groups in the 1960s and 1980s. The lookout was added to the National Register of Historic Places in 1987, alongside other structures in the Mount Baker-Snoqualmie National Forest.

The mountain is used for recreational climbing, with a 15-mile-long (24 km) round-trip trail originating on the east side at a trailhead on the Mountain Loop Highway.

== See also ==
- Queest-alb Glacier
