= Skagit Valley Hospital =

Coordinates: 48°25′05″N 122°19′26″W

- Skagit Regional Health

Geography
- Location: Anacortes, Arlington, Camano Island, Mount Vernon, Sedro-Woolley, Stanwood, Skagit County, Washington, United States

Organization
- Care system: Public
- Type: Teaching
- Affiliated university: Pacific Northwest University of Health Sciences

Services
- Emergency department: Level III trauma center
- Beds: 137

History
- Founded: 1958

Links
- Website: www.skagitregionalhealth.org
- Lists: Hospitals in Washington state

Skagit Valley Hospital is a 137-bed public hospital located in Mount Vernon, in the US State Washington. The hospital operates a level 3 trauma center. Founded in 1958, the hospital was organized as a Public District operating in Skagit Valley Public Hospital District #1. The hospital operates two osteopathic residency programs, in internal medicine and family medicine. The hospital is operated by Skagit Regional Health, which is partnered with the Cascade Valley Hospital in Arlington.

== History ==
Skagit Valley Hospital was founded in 1958. The operations of the hospital are overseen by a seven-member Board of Commissioners, elected by the district's constituents. In June 2007, the hospital opened a 220,000 square foot expansion, at a cost of $95 million. The expansion included 92 patient rooms, 6 operating rooms, a birthing center, and an emergency department.

On July 1, 2010, Skagit Valley Hospital acquired Skagit Valley Medical Center, a multi-specialty medical group, with facilities in six locations in the Skagit Valley. As of the acquisition the former Medical Center facilities was renamed Skagit Regional Clinics. The combined organization is now known as Skagit Regional Health, which also acquired Cascade Valley Hospital in Arlington in 2016.

In 2011, the hospital began training medical students. In 2012, the hospital opened an internal medicine residency. In the same year, Skagit Valley Hospital opened a new mental health facility.

== Services ==
The hospital includes 137 beds, and operates a level 3 trauma center through its emergency department and a Cardiac Catheterization Unit. The hospital provides oncology services, including PET scanning.

== Graduate medical education ==
Skagit Valley Hospital operates two residency programs, which train newly graduated physicians. There are Family Medicine and Internal Medicine residency programs. Both programs are accredited by the ACGME and maintain osteopathic recognition from the AOA. Medical students from Pacific Northwest University of Health Sciences rotate at Skagit Valley Hospital.
