= Inga Witscher =

American cook and farmer

Inga Witscher (born 1982) is an American cook and farmer best known as the host of the television show Around the Farm Table, which has aired on Wisconsin Public Television and other PBS Stations.

Witscher's activities, along with her husband, Chance Orth, have included a recipe blog, market sales, magazine columns, bed and breakfast business, and a popular television show.

== Biography ==
In 1982, Inga Witscher was born in Arlington, Washington. A fourth-generation organic dairy farmer, she grew up on her family's dairy farm on the United States West Coast and made cheese on the East Coast.

In 2000, Witscher graduated from Arlington High School in Arlington, Washington.

In 2006, Witscher moved to Wisconsin. She began her culinary career owning and operating her father Rick Witscher's small 40-acre (16 ha) organic dairy farm near Osseo, Wisconsin.

In 2011, Witscher married her first husband, Joe Maurer of Marine on St. Croix, Minnesota. After buying her father's farm, they soon conceived of the show which would become Around the Farm Table.

In 2012, Witscher became the host of Around the Farm Table on PBS. Witscher has also partnered with public television stations and travel agencies to be the host of group tours across the United States.

In 2016, Witscher decided to effectively end major involvement with the dairy business, selling off most of the herd from her "St. Isidore's Mead", her farm in Hale, Wisconsin, just south of Osseo in Trempealeau County.

After leaving the commercial dairy business, Witscher (also known by her new married name Inga Orth) began exploring new directions for the Osseo farm, such as garlic farming. Along with her father Rick, who serves as a producer for her show Around the Farm Table, she began to explore modern sustainable farming practices.

On 14 November 2018, a major fire at Witscher's Osseo farm destroyed the barn and a creamery which had just been built, killing three calves, although the remaining cows and farm house itself were saved.

=== Television ===
- Around the Farm Table (2012–present)
