= Arlington Fly-In =

Air show in Arlington, Washington

- Genre: Air show
- Venue: Arlington Municipal Airport
- Location: Arlington, Washington
- Country: U.S.A.
- Website: Arlington Fly-In website

The Arlington Fly-In, also known as the Arlington Air Show, was an annual airshow hosted in Arlington, Washington at the Arlington Municipal Airport (IATA airport code AWO). Thousands of general aviation pilots fly in from around the country and camp for up to four days, many showing their aircraft for judging.

The Northwest Fly-In is the third largest in the nation, after Oshkosh's EAA AirVenture Oshkosh and Lakeland's Sun N' Fun.

Until 2008, the event was known as the Northwest EAA Fly-In. It was moved from July to August in 2019 because of scheduling issues with other city events.

As of November 24, 2025, the Arlington Fly-In Board of Directors voted unanimously to close the organization.

== History ==
The Arlington Fly-In originated in August 1969, when a group of Washington pilots flying experimental aircraft gathered at Arlington Municipal Airport. The pilots had previously used Arlington as a stopover while traveling to the Abbotsford International Airshow in Canada, but tighter Canadian border rules for experimental aircraft led them to remain in Arlington instead. The informal gathering became an annual event.
