= Trafton School =

Historic school in Washington, United States

Coordinates: 48°14′12″N 122°03′34″W

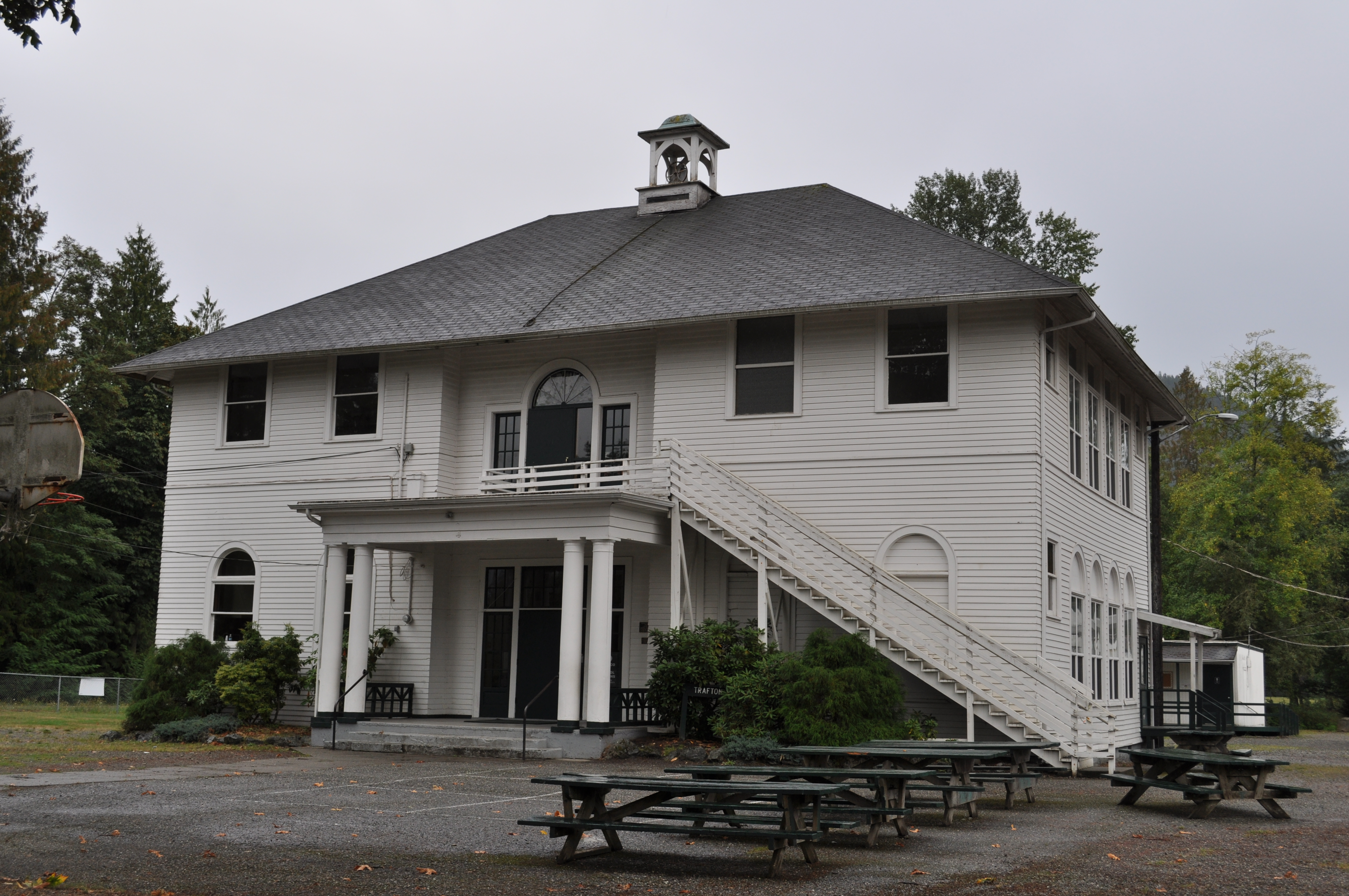
Trafton School

The Trafton Elementary School in Arlington, Washington, United States was founded in 1888, rebuilt after a fire in 1912, and is listed on the Washington State Heritage Register and the National Register of Historic Places. In February 2010, the Arlington School District was considering closing the school after the current school year. Then in June they indeed voted to do so.

The two-story building, described in 2010 by the Everett Herald as "the oldest continuously operating small school in Washington", still retains its old school bell on the roof. It is the focal point of the Trafton community northeast of Arlington proper, and is the site of the annual Trafton Fair every September. As of 2010, the K-5 school has 135 students, from about 70 families.

Facing a $2.4 million budget crunch from the late-2000s recession, Arlington decided to close the school. According to the Everett Herald, Arlington's Eagle Creek Elementary School several miles away was "about 200 students below its capacity and could easily take in the staff and students from Trafton." Trafton needed about $850,000 in repairs and improvements, which would have had to be funded by a bond issue if the school was to remain open; conversely, rolling Trafton into Eagle Creek was projected to save an estimated $300,000 a year.

It was later renovated into a 5,392 sq. ft private residence and placed on the market in 2023 for $1.5 million.
