= Arlington, Washington =

Arlington
- City
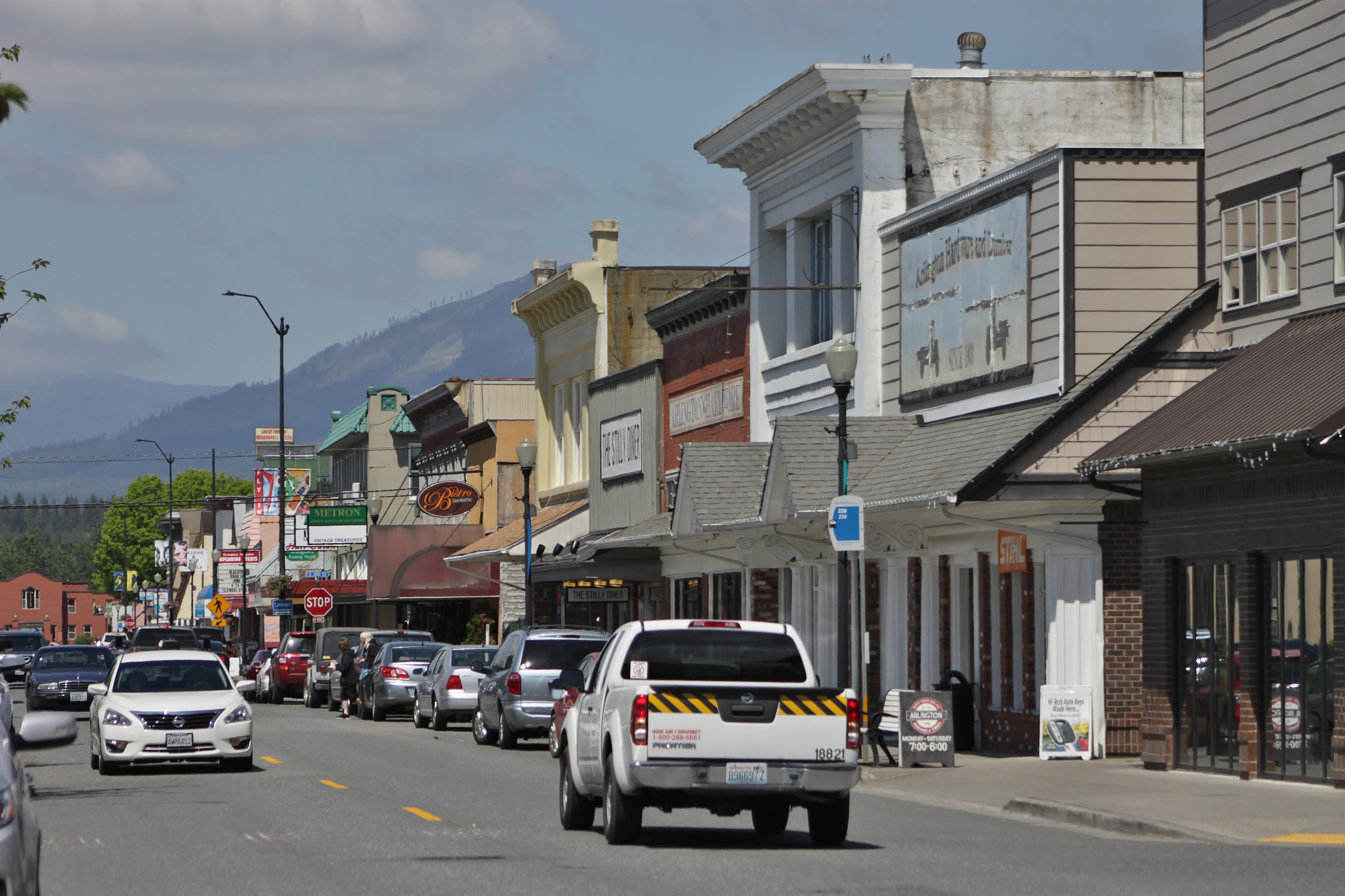
- Olympic Avenue in downtown Arlington

- Flag Seal
- Interactive map of Arlington
- Coordinates: 48°10′52″N 122°8′20″W
- Country: United States
- State: Washington
- County: Snohomish
- Incorporated: May 20, 1903

Government
  - Type: Mayor–council
  - Mayor: Don Vanney

Area
  - Total: 9.81 sq mi (25.4 km^{2})
  - Land: 9.80 sq mi (25.4 km^{2})
  - Water: 0.01 sq mi (0.026 km^{2})
- Elevation: 115 ft (35 m)

Population (2020)
  - Total: 19,868
  - Estimate (2024): 21,959
  - Density: 2,024.45/sq mi (781.64/km^{2})
- Time zone: UTC-8 (PST)
  - Summer (DST): UTC-7 (PDT)
- ZIP Code: 98223
- Area code: 360, 564
- FIPS code: 53-02585
- GNIS feature ID: 1515947
- Website: www.arlingtonwa.gov

Arlington is a city in northern Snohomish County, Washington, United States, part of the Seattle metropolitan area. The city lies on the Stillaguamish River in the western foothills of the Cascade Range, adjacent to the city of Marysville. It is approximately 10 miles (16 km) north of Everett, the county seat, and 40 miles (64 km) north of Seattle, the state's largest city. As of the 2020 U.S. census, Arlington had a population of 19,868; its estimated population is 21,959 as of 2024.

The city lies in the traditional territory of the Stillaguamish people, an indigenous Coast Salish group. Arlington was established in the 1880s by settlers and the area was platted as two towns, Arlington and Haller City. Haller City was absorbed by the larger Arlington, which was incorporated as a city in 1903. During the Great Depression of the 1930s, the Arlington area was the site of major projects undertaken for employment under the direction of federal relief agencies, including construction of a municipal airport that would serve as a naval air station during World War II. Arlington began suburbanizing in the 1980s, growing by more than 450 percent by 2000 and annexing the unincorporated area of Smokey Point to the southwest.

The economy of the Arlington area historically relied on timber and agriculture. In the early 21st century, it has transitioned to a service economy, with some aviation industry jobs near the municipal airport. The city is governed by a mayor–council government, electing a mayor and seven city councilmembers. The municipal government maintains the city's parks system and water and wastewater utilities. Other services, including public utilities, public transportation, and schools, are contracted to regional or county-level agencies and companies.

== History ==
=== Pre-incorporation ===
The indigenous Coast Salish peoples have inhabited the Puget Sound region since the retreat of the Vashon Glacier approximately 12,000 years ago. Several archeological sites along the Stillaguamish River contain artifacts that are dated to the Olcott Phase, approximately 9,000 years before present. The traditional territory of the Stillaguamish people includes modern-day Arlington and much of the Stillaguamish River basin; they had at least ten known villages along the river and its tributaries, including two in the Arlington area. Among them was sq̓ʷuʔalqʷuʔ (meaning "confluence"; variously anglicized as Skabalko or Skabalco), a settlement with winter longhouses and 200–300 people at the confluence of the two forks of the Stillaguamish River. Other Coast Salish peoples who were intermarried with the Stillaguamish would travel to this village in the summer to follow fish runs. The neighborhood of Kent Prairie (Lushootseed: xʷbaqʷab) was once a prairie where the Stillaguamish, Sauk, and Snohomish would gather wild crops. In modern Lushootseed, Arlington and the surrounding area is named stiqayuʔ, meaning "wolf".

American exploration of the area began in 1851, when prospector Samuel Hancock was led by Indian guides on a canoe up the Stillaguamish River. The area was opened to logging after the signing of the Treaty of Point Elliott in 1855 between the federal government and various Puget Sound peoples. The Stillaguamish, one of the signatory tribes, were ordered to travel to the Tulalip Indian Reservation, but many members refused and remained in their ancestral lands. After attempts in the early 20th century, the tribe were granted federal recognition in 1976 and a reservation in 2014.

In 1856, the U.S. Army built a military road connecting Fort Steilacoom to Fort Bellingham, crossing the Stillaguamish River near the confluence. In the 1880s, wagon roads were constructed to this area from the towns of Marysville to the south and Silvana to the west, bringing entrepreneurs to the logging camps, informally named "The Forks". The area's first store was opened in 1888 by Nels K. Tvete and Nils C. Johnson, and was followed by a hotel with lodging and meals for loggers.

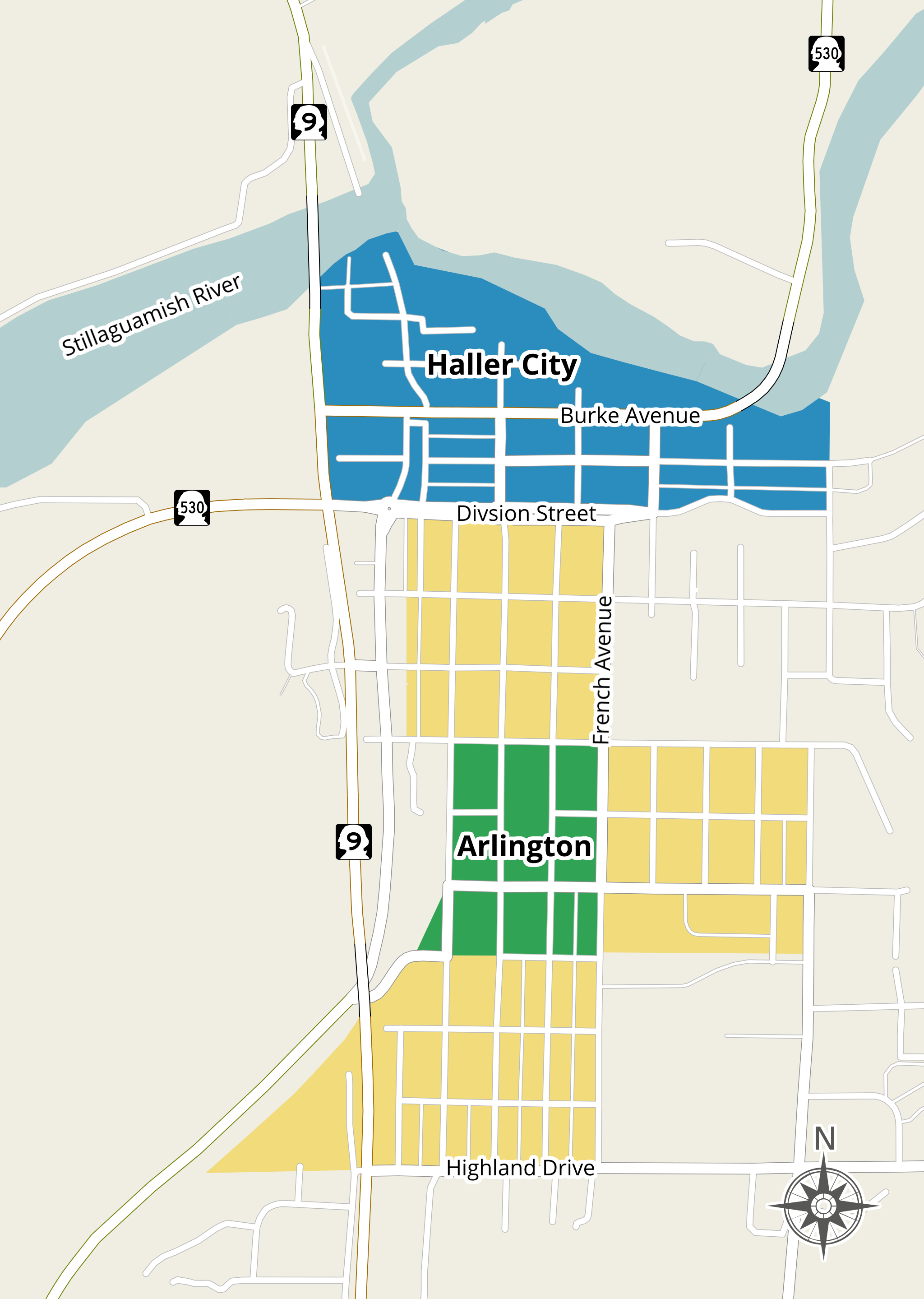
Map of original plats and claims for Arlington (green) and Haller City (blue), along with later additions to Arlington (yellow), overlaid on modern-day downtown Arlington

Two settlements were established on the south side of the confluence in anticipation of the Seattle, Lake Shore and Eastern Railway building a track through the area. G. Morris Haller, son of Colonel Granville O. Haller, founded a settlement on the banks of the Stillaguamish River in 1883, naming it "Haller City".

The Seattle, Lake Shore & Eastern Railroad chose to build its depot on higher ground to the south of Haller City, leading contractors Earl & McLeod to establish a new town at the depot on March 15, 1890. The new town was named "Arlington" after Lord Henry Arlington, member of the cabinet of King Charles II of England. Arlington and Haller City were platted within a month of each other in 1890, quickly developing a rivalry that would continue for several years.

Arlington and Haller City grew rapidly in their first years, reaching a combined population of 500 by 1893, relying on agriculture, dairy farming and the manufacturing of wood shingles as their main sources of income. Both towns established their own schools, post offices, saloons, general stores, churches, social clubs, and hotels. The two towns were separated by a 40-acre (16 ha) tract claimed by two settlers in 1891, preventing either town from fully absorbing the other. During the late 1890s, the claim dispute was settled and merchants began moving to the larger, more prosperous Arlington, signalling the end for Haller City. Today, Haller City is memorialized in the name of a park in downtown Arlington, as well as a middle school operated by the Arlington School District.

=== Incorporation and early 20th century ===
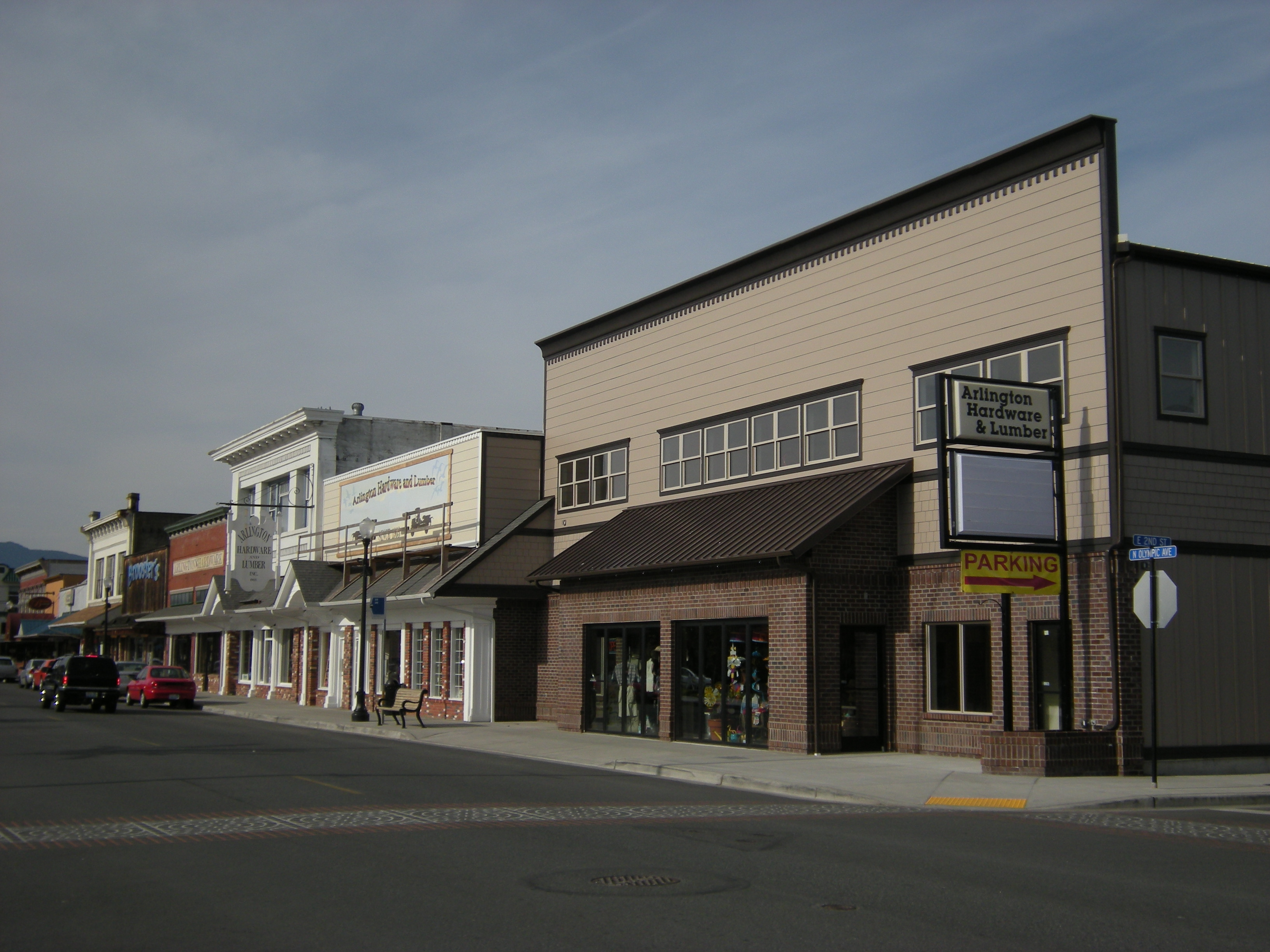
Storefronts on Olympic Avenue in downtown Arlington were built during the city's early history and have since been preserved

Arlington was incorporated as a fourth-class city on May 20, 1903, including the remnants of Haller City (located north of modern-day Division Street). The incorporation came after a referendum on May 5, in which 134 of 173 voters approved the city's incorporation. The new city elected shingle mill owner John M. Smith as its first mayor. In the years following incorporation, Arlington gained a local bank, a cooperative creamery, a city park, a library, electricity, and telephone service.

During the early 20th century, Arlington's largest employers remained its shingle mills and saw mills. Other industries, including dairy processing, mechanical shops, stores, and factories, became prominent after World War I, during a period of growth for the city. The Great Depression of the 1930s forced all but one of the mills to close, causing unemployment to rise in Arlington and neighboring cities. The federal government established a Civilian Conservation Corps (CCC) camp near Darrington to create temporary jobs; the young men built structures and conducted firefighting in the Mount Baker National Forest. The Works Progress Administration and Civil Works Administration funded the construction of the city's sidewalks, a high school, and a municipal airport that opened in 1934.

The entry of the United States into World War II brought the U.S. Navy to Arlington, resulting in the conversion of the municipal airport into a naval air station in 1943. The Navy constructed new runways and hangars and, beginning in 1946, the municipal government was allowed to operate civilian and commercial services. Ownership of the airport was formally transferred from the federal government back to the city of Arlington in 1959.

On October 19, 1959, a Boeing 707-227 crashed on the banks of the Stillaguamish River's North Fork during a test flight, killing four of eight occupants. The plane, being flown by Boeing test pilots instructing personnel from Braniff International Airways, lost three engines and suffered a fire in the fourth after a dutch roll had been executed beyond maximum bank restrictions. The plane made an emergency landing in the riverbed while unsuccessfully trying to reach a nearby open field.

=== Suburbanization and present day ===
The completion of Interstate 5 and State Route 9 in the late 1960s brought increased residential development in Arlington, forming a bedroom community for commuters who worked in Everett and Seattle. Despite the influx of commuting residents, Arlington retained its small-town image while unsuccessfully attempting to lure new industries and a state college. Suburban housing developments began construction in the 1980s and 1990s, driving a 450 percent increase in Arlington's population to 15,000 by 2007. In 1999, Arlington annexed the community of Smokey Point, located along Interstate 5 to the southwest of the city, after a lengthy court battle with Marysville, which instead was permitted to annex Lakewood to the west. The city began developing a large business park around the municipal airport in the 1990s, bringing the city's number of jobs to a total of 11,000 by 2003.

The city of Arlington celebrated its centennial in 2003 with a parade, a festival honoring the city's history, sporting events, and musical and theatrical performances. The centennial celebrations culminated in the dedication of the $44 million Arlington High School campus, attended by an all-class reunion of the old school. In 2007, the city of Arlington renovated six blocks of downtown's Olympic Avenue at a cost of $4.4 million, widening sidewalks, improving street foliage, and adding new street lights. The project was credited with helping revitalize the city's downtown, turning Olympic Avenue into a gathering place for residents and a venue for festivals.

On March 22, 2014, a large landslide near Oso dammed the North Fork of the Stillaguamish River, with mud and debris covering an area of one square mile (2.6 km^{2}). A total of 43 people were killed and nearly 50 structures destroyed. The landslide closed State Route 530 to Darrington, cutting the town off, leaving Arlington as the center of the coordinated emergency response to the disaster. Arlington was recognized for its role in aiding victims of the disaster and hosted U.S. President Barack Obama during his visit to the site in April.

The city has continued to grow in the late 2010s, with new apartment buildings constructed in Smokey Point, including those designed as retirement communities. The Cascade Industrial Center, located on 4,000 acres (1,600 ha) between Arlington and Marysville, was designated by the Puget Sound Regional Council in 2019 and is planned to house manufacturing and other industrial uses.

== Geography ==
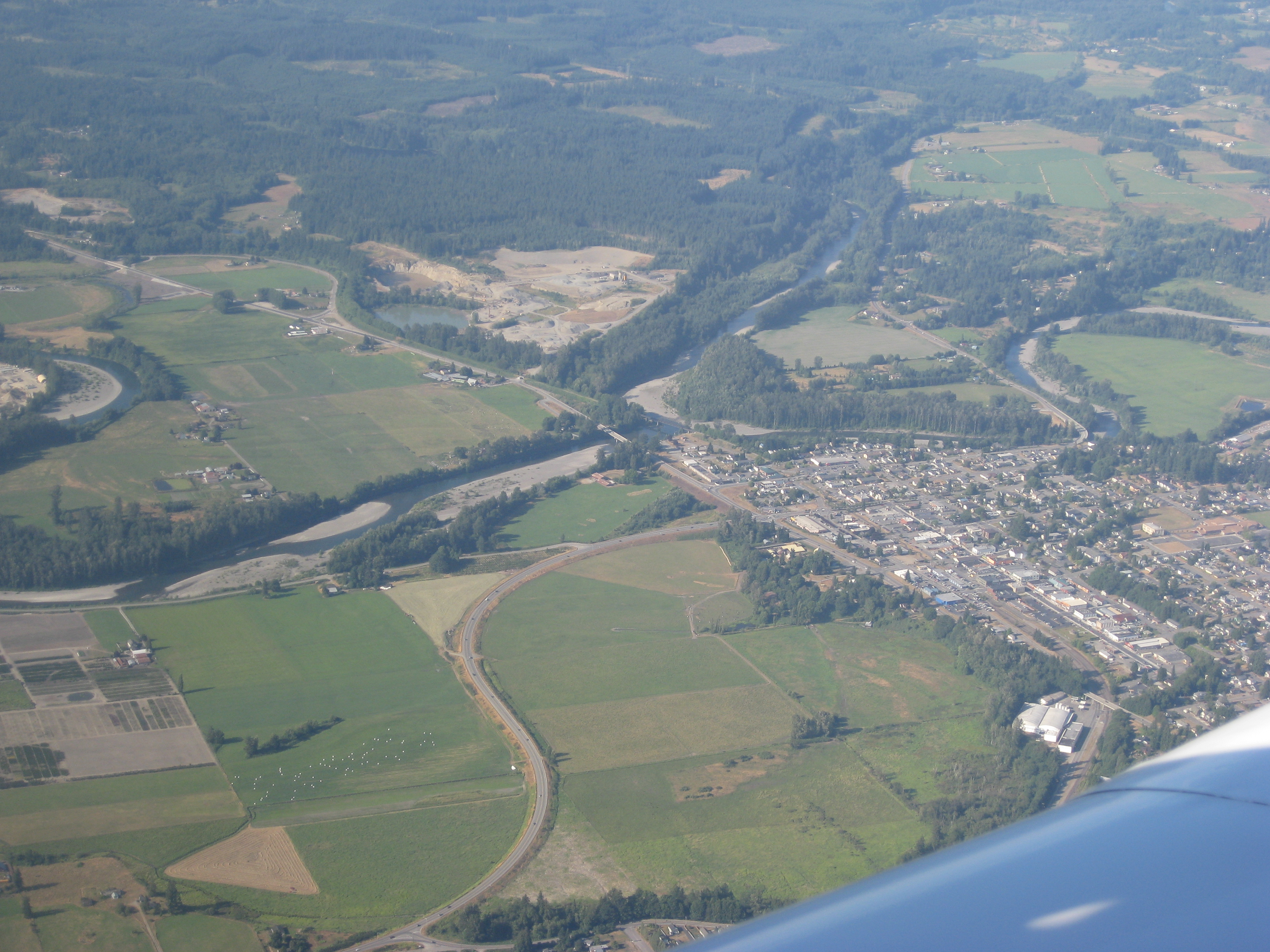
Aerial view of downtown Arlington and the Stillaguamish River floodplain

According to the United States Census Bureau, the city of Arlington has a total area of 9.26 square miles (23.98 km^{2}), of which 9.25 square miles (23.96 km^{2}) is land and 0.01 square miles (0.03 km^{2}) is water. The city is in the northwestern part of Snohomish County in Western Washington, and is considered part of the Seattle metropolitan area. It is approximately 41 miles (66 km) north of Seattle and 10 miles (16 km) north of Everett. Arlington's city limits are generally defined to the south by Marysville at State Route 531 (172nd Street NE) and roughly 165th Street NE, to the west by Interstate 5, to the north by the Stillaguamish River valley, and to the east by the Cascade Range foothills. The city's urban growth boundary includes 10.3 square miles (27 km^{2}) within and outside of city limits.

The city lies on a glacial terrace formed during the Pleistocene epoch by the recession of the Cordilleran Ice Sheet. Arlington covers a series of hills that sit at an elevation of 100 to 200 feet (30 to 61 m) above sea level. Downtown Arlington is situated on a bluff above the confluence of the Stillaguamish River and its North and South Forks. Most of Arlington sits in the watersheds of the Stillaguamish River, Portage Creek, and Quilceda Creek. From various points in Arlington, the Olympic Mountains, Mount Pilchuck, and Mount Rainier are visible on the horizon.

The Stillaguamish River valley and floodplain, including Arlington, lies in a lahar hazard zone 60 miles (97 km) downstream from Glacier Peak, an active stratovolcano in the eastern part of the county. During an eruption 13,000 years ago, several eruption-generated lahars deposited more than 7 feet (2 m) of sediment on modern-day Arlington.

=== Subareas and neighborhoods ===
The city of Arlington publishes a decennial comprehensive plan, which divides the urban growth area into ten planning subareas, each containing neighborhoods and subdivisions.

- Old Town consists of downtown Arlington and surrounding residential neighborhoods built during the early 20th century. The northern reaches of Old Town include commercial areas developed during the post-war period that are distinct from older buildings along Olympic Avenue.
- Arlington Bluff is a residential area between the Stillaguamish River floodplain and the Arlington Municipal Airport industrial center.
- Kent Prairie, a residential area south of Old Town, was developed in the early post-war period. The subarea also includes retail stores centered around the intersection of State Route 9 and 204th Street NE. The area was once home to a Stillaguamish village, as well as Arlington's first schoolhouse, built in 1884.
- The designated Manufacturing Industrial Center is an industrial district southwest of Old Town, surrounding the Arlington Municipal Airport and the city's only active railroad.
- Hilltop consists of Arlington's largest planned residential subdivisions, including High Clover Park, Gleneagle, Crown Ridge, and the Magnolias. It is south of Kent Prairie on a large terrace on the west side of State Route 9. Gleneagle is Arlington's largest single development, with over 1,000 homes and a private golf course.
- The Brekhus/Beach subarea, also known as Burn Hill, is a residential area southeast of Old Town and is centered along Burn Road.

The West Arlington Subarea, designated in 2011, combines several neighborhoods annexed by Arlington in the 1990s and 2000s, including Smokey Point and Island Crossing.

- Smokey Point, annexed by Arlington in 1999, is a major commercial and residential area at the junction of Interstate 5 and State Route 531, southwest of Arlington. Portions of Smokey Point extend south and west into the city of Marysville, which annexed the area in the 2000s.
- Island Crossing, at the junction of Interstate 5 and State Route 530, is a rural community with a cluster of retail stores. It was annexed by Arlington in 2008, and has been re-designated for commercial development.
- The proposed King-Thompson subarea is northwest of Smokey Point and lies outside of Arlington's city limits and urban growth boundary. It has been identified as a potential area for extensive residential development. The municipal government applied to annex the area into the city's urban growth area in 2013, but withdrew the application in 2016.

=== Climate ===
Arlington has a general climate similar to most of the Puget Sound lowlands, with dry summers and mild, rainy winters moderated by a marine influence from the Pacific Ocean. The majority of the region's precipitation arrives during the winter and early spring, and Arlington averages 181 days of precipitation per year. Arlington's location in the foothills of the Cascade Range brings additional precipitation compared to nearby communities, with 46 inches (1,200 mm) annually compared to 33 inches (840 mm) in Everett. Arlington rarely receives significant snowfall, with an average of 7 inches (18 cm) per year since 1922.

July is Arlington's warmest month, with average high temperatures of 73.6 °F (23.1 °C), while January is the coolest, at an average high of 44.5 °F (6.9 °C). The highest recorded temperature, 103 °F (39 °C), occurred on June 28, 2021, amid a regional heat wave, and the lowest, 7 °F (−14 °C), occurred on January 1, 1979. According to the Köppen climate classification system, Arlington has a warm-summer Mediterranean climate (Csb).

Climate data for Arlington
Month	Jan	Feb	Mar	Apr	May	Jun	Jul	Aug	Sep	Oct	Nov	Dec	Year
Record high °F (°C)	59 (15)	70 (21)	75 (24)	79 (26)	83 (28)	103 (39)	93 (34)	94 (34)	86 (30)	98 (37)	66 (19)	60 (16)	103 (39)
Mean daily maximum °F (°C)	46.1 (7.8)	49.9 (9.9)	54.0 (12.2)	59.8 (15.4)	66.9 (19.4)	71.1 (21.7)	77.3 (25.2)	77.4 (25.2)	70.9 (21.6)	64.6 (18.1)	52.1 (11.2)	45.3 (7.4)	61.3 (16.3)
Mean daily minimum °F (°C)	29.9 (−1.2)	31.5 (−0.3)	33.5 (0.8)	37.5 (3.1)	42.5 (5.8)	47.1 (8.4)	50.1 (10.1)	50.2 (10.1)	46.5 (8.1)	38 (3)	32.5 (0.3)	30.3 (−0.9)	39.1 (3.9)
Record low °F (°C)	7 (−14)	3 (−16)	15 (−9)	25 (−4)	30 (−1)	35 (2)	40 (4)	39 (4)	30 (−1)	23 (−5)	9 (−13)	1 (−17)	1 (−17)
Average precipitation inches (mm)	5.82 (148)	4.43 (113)	4.52 (115)	3.82 (97)	3.30 (84)	2.71 (69)	1.33 (34)	1.55 (39)	2.67 (68)	4.57 (116)	6.18 (157)	6.18 (157)	47.08 (1,197)
Average snowfall inches (cm)	2.5 (6.4)	2.2 (5.6)	0.9 (2.3)	0 (0)	0 (0)	0 (0)	0 (0)	0 (0)	0 (0)	0 (0)	0.5 (1.3)	2.1 (5.3)	8.2 (20.9)
Average precipitation days	20	16	18	16	13	12	6	7	10	15	19	20	172
Source: Western Regional Climate Center (1922–2012)

== Demographics ==
Historical population
Census	Pop.	Note	%±
1910	1,476		—
1920	1,418		−3.9%
1930	1,439		1.5%
1940	1,460		1.5%
1950	1,635		12.0%
1960	2,025		23.9%
1970	2,261		11.7%
1980	3,282		45.2%
1990	4,037		23.0%
2000	11,713		190.1%
2010	17,926		53.0%
2020	19,868		10.8%
2024 (est.)	21,959		10.5%
Source: U.S. Decennial Census

The city of Arlington had a population of 19,868 people at the time of the 2020 U.S. census, making it the tenth largest of eighteen cities in Snohomish County. From 1980 to 2010, Arlington's population increased by over 450 percent, fueled by the construction of suburban housing and annexations of outlying areas. A population estimate in 2017 projected that Arlington would have nearly 25,000 residents by 2035.

=== 2020 census ===
As of the 2020 census, there were 19,868 people and 7,365 households living in Arlington, which had a population density of 2,024.5 inhabitants per square mile (781.7/km^{2}). There were 7,751 total housing units, of which 95% were occupied and 5% were vacant or for occasional use. The racial makeup of the city was 77.2% White, 1.5% Native American and Alaskan Native, 1.2% Black or African American, 3.2% Asian, and 0.6% Native Hawaiian and Pacific Islander. Residents who identified as more than one race were 10.8% of the population. Hispanic or Latino residents of any race were 12.5% of the population.

Of the 7,365 households in Arlington, 48.1% were married couples living together and 8.6% were cohabitating but unmarried. Households with a male householder with no spouse or partner were 16.2% of the population, while households with a female householder with no spouse or partner were 27.1% of the population. Out of all households, 35.6% had children under the age of 18 living with them and 28.6% had residents who were 65 years of age or older. There were 7,365 occupied housing units in Arlington, of which 62.1% were owner-occupied and 37.9% were occupied by renters.

The median age in the city was 36.4 years old for all sexes, 35.2 years old for males, and 37.5 years old for females. Of the total population, 29.3% of residents were under the age of 19; 26.9% were between the ages of 20 and 39; 30.9% were between the ages of 49 and 64; and 13.8% were 65 years of age or older. The gender makeup of the city was 48.8% male and 51.2% female.

=== 2010 census ===
As of the 2010 census, there were 17,926 people, 6,563 households, and 4,520 families residing in the city. The population density was 1,937.9 inhabitants per square mile (748.2/km^{2}). There were 6,929 housing units at an average density of 749.1 per square mile (289.2/km^{2}). The racial makeup of the city was 85.6% White, 1.2% African American, 1.4% Native American, 3.3% Asian, 0.3% Pacific Islander, 3.9% from other races, and 4.2% from two or more races. Hispanic or Latino of any race were 9.5% of the population.

There were 6,563 households, of which 40.3% had children under the age of 18 living with them, 50.7% were married couples living together, 12.6% had a female householder with no husband present, 5.6% had a male householder with no wife present, and 31.1% were non-families. 24.0% of all households were made up of individuals, and 10.2% had someone living alone who was 65 years of age or older. The average household size was 2.70 and the average family size was 3.21.

The median age in the city was 34.3 years. 28.3% of residents were under the age of 18; 8.7% were between the ages of 18 and 24; 29.2% were from 25 to 44; 22.4% were from 45 to 64; and 11.3% were 65 years of age or older. The gender makeup of the city was 48.6% male and 51.4% female.

== Economy ==
As of 2015, Arlington has an estimated 9,481 residents who were in the workforce, either employed or unemployed. The average one-way commute for Arlington workers in 2015 was approximately 30 minutes; 85 percent of workers drove alone to their workplace, while 7 percent carpooled, and 2 percent used public transit. As of 2015, only 12 percent of employed Arlington residents work within city limits, while approximately 17 percent commute to Everett, 9 percent to Seattle, 8 percent to Marysville, 3 percent to Bellevue, 2 percent to Renton, and 49 percent to other cities, each of which accounted for less than 2 percent. The largest industry of employment for Arlington workers are educational services and health care, with approximately 19 percent, followed by manufacturing (18%), retail (11%), and food services (10%).

Arlington's early economy relied heavily on timber harvesting and processing, notably the production of red cedar wood shingles at mills that closed during the Great Depression of the 1930s. Locally, Arlington was known as the "Shingle Capital of the World", although mills in Everett and Ballard produced more shingles at the time. Agriculture and dairy farming emerged as significant industries to Arlington during the early 20th century, with farms lining the floodplain of the Stillaguamish River. A major cooperative creamery and condensery was established in Arlington during the 1910s, but later moved to Mount Vernon after World War II.

The transformation of Arlington into a bedroom community for Everett and Seattle during the 1980s and 1990s came with it a move towards a service economy. Among the largest employers of Arlington residents are the Boeing Everett Factory and Naval Station Everett. The expansion of the aerospace industry in the Seattle region led Arlington to develop its own municipal airport into an aerospace job center, which includes a high concentration of Boeing subcontractors. As of 2012, the airport has 130 on-site businesses that employ 590 people, with an annual economic output of $94.5 million. Aircraft manufacturer Glasair Aviation is based in Arlington, and Eviation Aircraft uses its Arlington hangars for assembly and testing of the Eviation Alice, an electric prototype model.

The city of Arlington plans to increase the number of jobs within the city to over 20,000 by 2035, bolstered by the designation of the Cascade Industrial Center by the Puget Sound Regional Council in 2019. The industrial center, located between the two cities near Smokey Point, already included major distribution centers and other light industry in the 2000s. A five-story, $355 million Amazon distribution center opened near the airport in 2023. It is the company's largest facility in Washington at 3 million square feet (280,000 m^{2}) and is expected to employ 1,200 workers.

== Government and politics ==
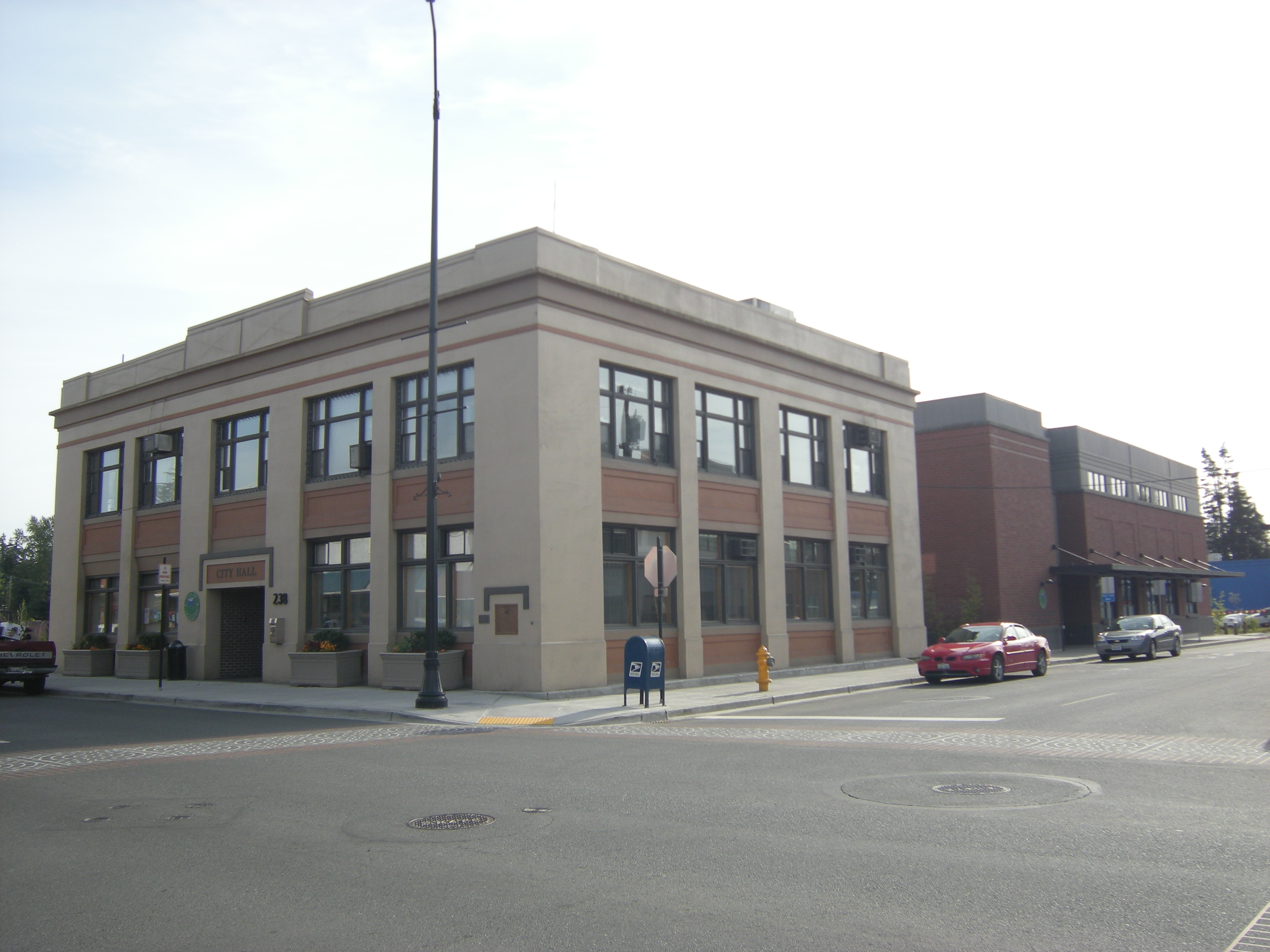
Arlington's city hall, located on Olympic Avenue in downtown

Arlington is defined as a non-charter code city and operates under a mayor–council government, with an elected mayor and an elected city council. The mayor serves a four-year term and has no term limits. Don Vanney was elected mayor in 2023 after defeating three-term incumbent Barbara Tolbert. Previous mayors included John and Margaret Larson, who served as mayor from 1980 to 1990 and 2003 to 2011, respectively.

The city council is composed of seven residents who are elected in at-large, non-partisan elections to four-year terms. The council also appoints a city administrator to oversee city operations. The council meets twice per month on Mondays in a chamber at city hall in downtown Arlington. According to the Washington State Auditor, Arlington's municipal government employs 128 people full-time and operates on an annual budget of $50 million. The city government switched to a biennial budget in 2017, after an ordinance was passed by the city council in 2016. The municipal government provides emergency services, as well as water and sewage utilities, street maintenance, parks and recreation, an airport, and a cemetery. Arlington's municipal fire department was annexed into the North County Regional Fire Authority in 2021, joining Stanwood and several unincorporated areas.

At the federal level, Arlington is part of Washington's 1st congressional district, which is represented by Democrat Suzan DelBene. Prior to redistricting in 2022, the city was part of the 2nd congressional district alongside most of western Snohomish County. At the state level, Arlington is part of the 10th legislative district along with Stanwood, southwestern Skagit County, and the entirety of Island County. Arlington is wholly part of the Snohomish County Council's 1st district, which covers the northeastern areas of the county.

During the 2020 U.S. presidential election, 53.8 percent of Arlington voters chose Republican Donald Trump, while 44.4 percent voted for Democrat Joe Biden, with 10,241 votes cast. During the 2016 U.S. presidential election, 50.6 percent of Arlington voters chose Republican Donald Trump, while 39.5 percent voted for Democrat Hillary Clinton. During the same year's gubernatorial election, 42.9 percent of Arlington voters preferred incumbent Democrat Jay Inslee, while 56.8 percent voted for Republican Bill Bryant. During the 2012 presidential election, Democrat Barack Obama won Arlington narrowly with 50.6 percent of votes. Arlington was proposed as the county seat of the secessionist Freedom County in the 1990s and 2000s, but the proposal was struck down by state courts.

== Culture ==
=== Arts ===
Public art has been mandated for public construction projects in Arlington since a 2007 ordinance setting 1 percent of the budget for new artworks. The Arlington Arts Council, a volunteer organization established in 2004, has acquired 30 sculptures and murals that form the city's Sculpture Walk in downtown Arlington and along the Centennial Trail. The Arlington High School campus has a performing arts venue, the Byrnes Performing Arts Center, which opened in 2007. A fine arts and crafts festival has been held annually at Legion Park since 2008 and is organized by the Arlington Arts Council. The city is also located near the Pilchuck Glass School, a rural art school that focuses on glass art.

A scene in the 2014 movie 7 Minutes was filmed at Haller Stadium in Arlington.

=== Parks and recreation ===
Arlington has 17 city-maintained parks with over 257 acres (104 ha) of public open space within its city limits and urban growth boundary. Park facilities include nature preserves, neighborhood parks, sports fields, playgrounds, boat launches, and gardens. The Arlington School District also has 59.3 acres (24.0 ha) of sports fields and playgrounds that are open to public use during non-school hours.

Arlington's largest park is the Country Charm Park and Conservation Area, located east of downtown Arlington along the South Fork Stillaguamish River. The 150-acre (61 ha) park was purchased from the Graafstra family in 2010, and is planned to be developed into sports fields, hiking trails, camping areas, and a swimming beach, in addition to a 40-acre (16 ha) riparian habitat. Across the South Fork is Twin Rivers Park, Arlington's second-largest park, a 50-acre (20 ha) park with sports fields that is owned by Snohomish County but maintained by the city of Arlington. The city's third-largest park, Bill Quake Memorial Park, consists of soccer and baseball fields on 13 acres (5.3 ha) near Arlington Municipal Airport.

The county government also owns the Portage Creek Wildlife Area, a 157-acre (64 ha) wildlife reserve located outside of city limits near downtown Arlington. The reserve was originally a dairy farm that was restored into wetland habitat in the 1990s and 2000s.

Arlington is at the intersection of two major county trails used by cyclists, pedestrians, and horseback riders: the Centennial Trail, which runs 29 miles (47 km) from Bryant to Snohomish; and the Whitehorse Trail, which will run 27 miles (43 km) east from Arlington to Darrington. Both trails use right of way acquired by Snohomish County after they were abandoned by the Burlington Northern Railroad in the late 20th century. The city of Arlington also maintains a 6-mile (9.7 km) unpaved walking trail around the Arlington Municipal Airport.

=== Festivals and events ===
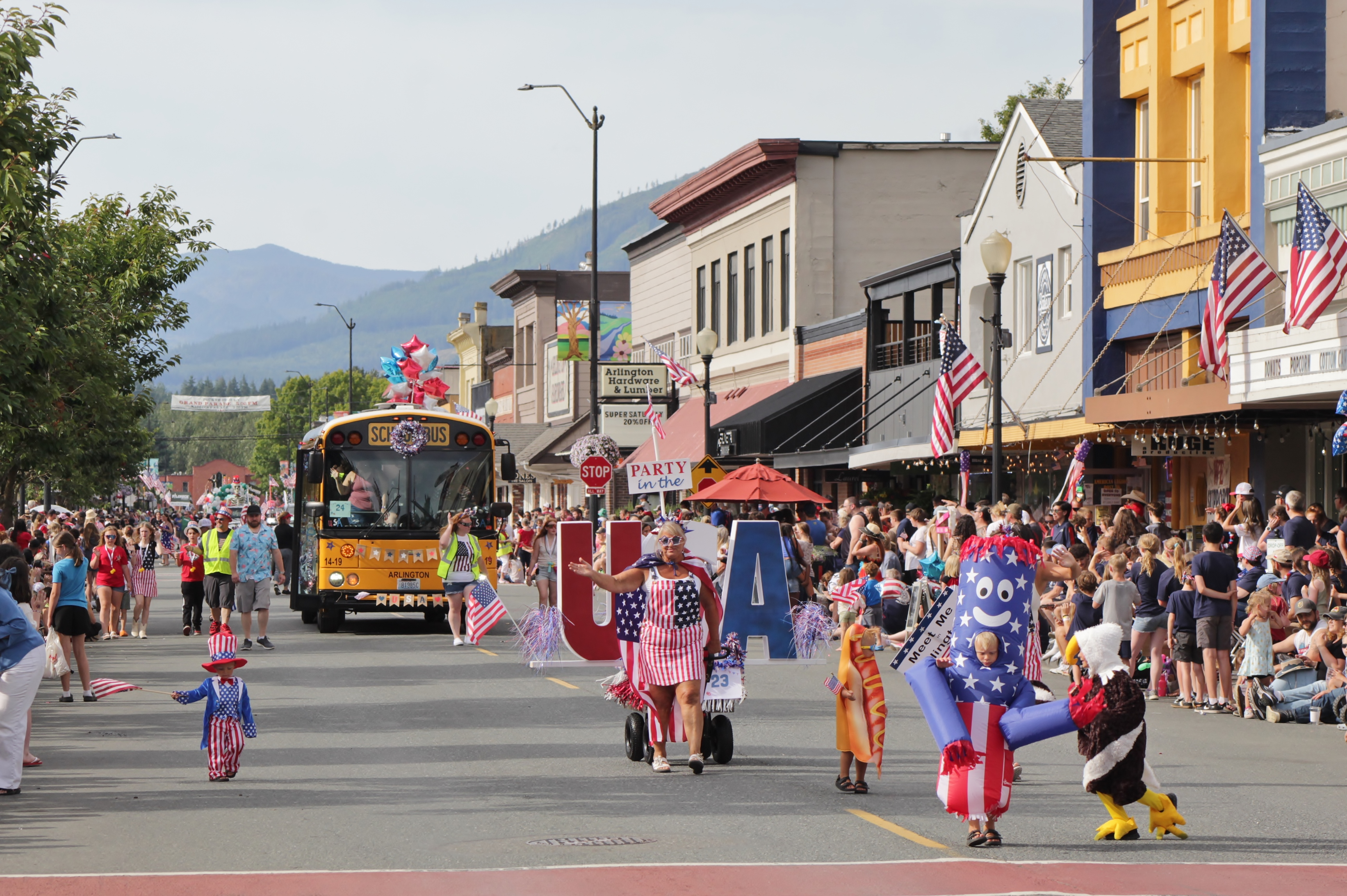
The 2025 Independence Day parade on Olympic Avenue

The Arlington Municipal Airport hosts the annual "Arlington Fly-In" air show during the summer, traditionally the weekend after Independence Day but later changed to August. The Fly-In has operated annually since 1969 and is the third-largest event of its kind in the United States, with over 50,000 visitors and 1,600 planes participating.

The Downtown Arlington Business Association hosts several annual events in downtown Arlington, including a car show in June, a street fair on Olympic Avenue in July, and a Viking festival in October. Legion Park hosts a weekend farmers' market from June to September and is also used as a staging ground for holiday parades. The Stillaguamish Tribe hosts an annual powwow and festival of the river at River Meadows County Park on the South Fork of the Stillaguamish River in August.

=== Media ===
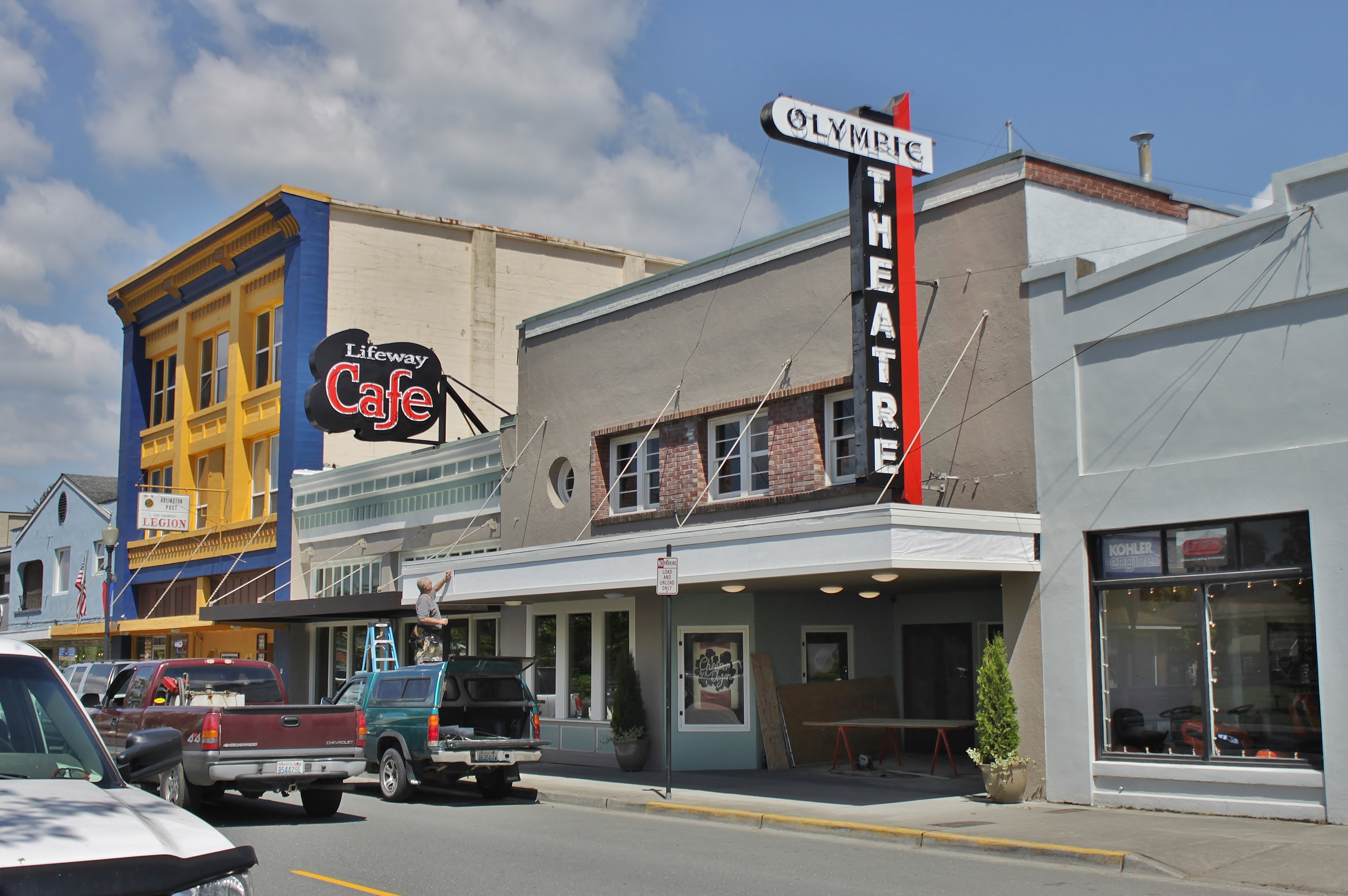
The Olympic Theatre in downtown Arlington, which operated as the city's lone movie theater from 1939 to 2014.

Arlington was formerly served by one weekly newspaper, The Arlington Times, which had published in the area since 1890 and had been under common ownership with the Marysville Globe since 1964. Sound Publishing, which acquired both papers in 2007, suspended their publication in March 2020 in the wake of the COVID-19 pandemic; it also owns the Everett-based Daily Herald, which serves the entire county, including Arlington. Arlington is additionally part of the Seattle–Tacoma media market, and is served by Seattle-based media outlets including The Seattle Times; broadcast television stations KOMO-TV, KING-TV, KIRO-TV, and KCPQ-TV; and various radio stations.

Attempts to establish a library in Arlington date as far back as 1900 when a reading room acquired 55 books for public lending; another circulating library was organized in December 1905. An official public library was established in October 1912 with the formation of a library association; its first building was on Third Street and Railroad Avenue. The library moved in 1925 to the city hall; the library association continued to operate it until the city council passed ordinances to operate it in November 1955, with city-based operations effective January 1, 1956. Planning for a new library building began around that time, with funding kickstarted via the sale of a house on McLeod Avenue bequeathed to the library then that was deemed too expensive to maintain; a $6,000 bond issue for the new building was approved by voters in November 1960. Groundbreaking on the new library building at McLeod Avenue and Third Street was held in March 1961; it was finished the same year, with the dedication held on October 21. In the meantime, the Arlington city council negotiated with the Snohomish County Library in May 1961 to have the latter operate the library; the city became part of the Sno-Isle Libraries system when the latter merged with its Island County counterpart the following year. A 5,055-square-foot (469.6 m^{2}) library near downtown Arlington opened on June 28, 1981, and holds over 54,000 items. It was originally owned by the city government and was transferred to Sno-Isle in 2021 as part of preparations for a renovation, which had been planned since the 2000s. Sno-Isle identified the Arlington Library as a top priority for renovation and expansion in 2016, while also emphasizing the need for a new library to serve Smokey Point. A pilot library for Smokey Point opened in January 2018, using a leased retail space. Arlington had a single-screen, 381-seat movie theater, the Olympic Theatre in downtown Arlington, that operated from 1939 to 2014.

=== Historical preservation ===
The volunteer-operated Stillaguamish Valley Pioneer Museum, southwest of downtown Arlington, opened in 1997. The museum overlooks the Stillaguamish River and features preserved household items, logging equipment, and vehicles, historic newspapers and images from the Arlington area, and a model railroad.

The Arlington area has two properties listed on the National Register of Historic Places (NRHP). The Trafton School in Trafton was built in 1888 and re-built in 1912 after a fire. It was listed as a historic place in 2006, shortly before it was closed by the Arlington School District. The Arlington Naval Auxiliary Air Station (part of the modern-day Arlington Municipal Airport) was listed as a historic place in 1995.

== Education ==
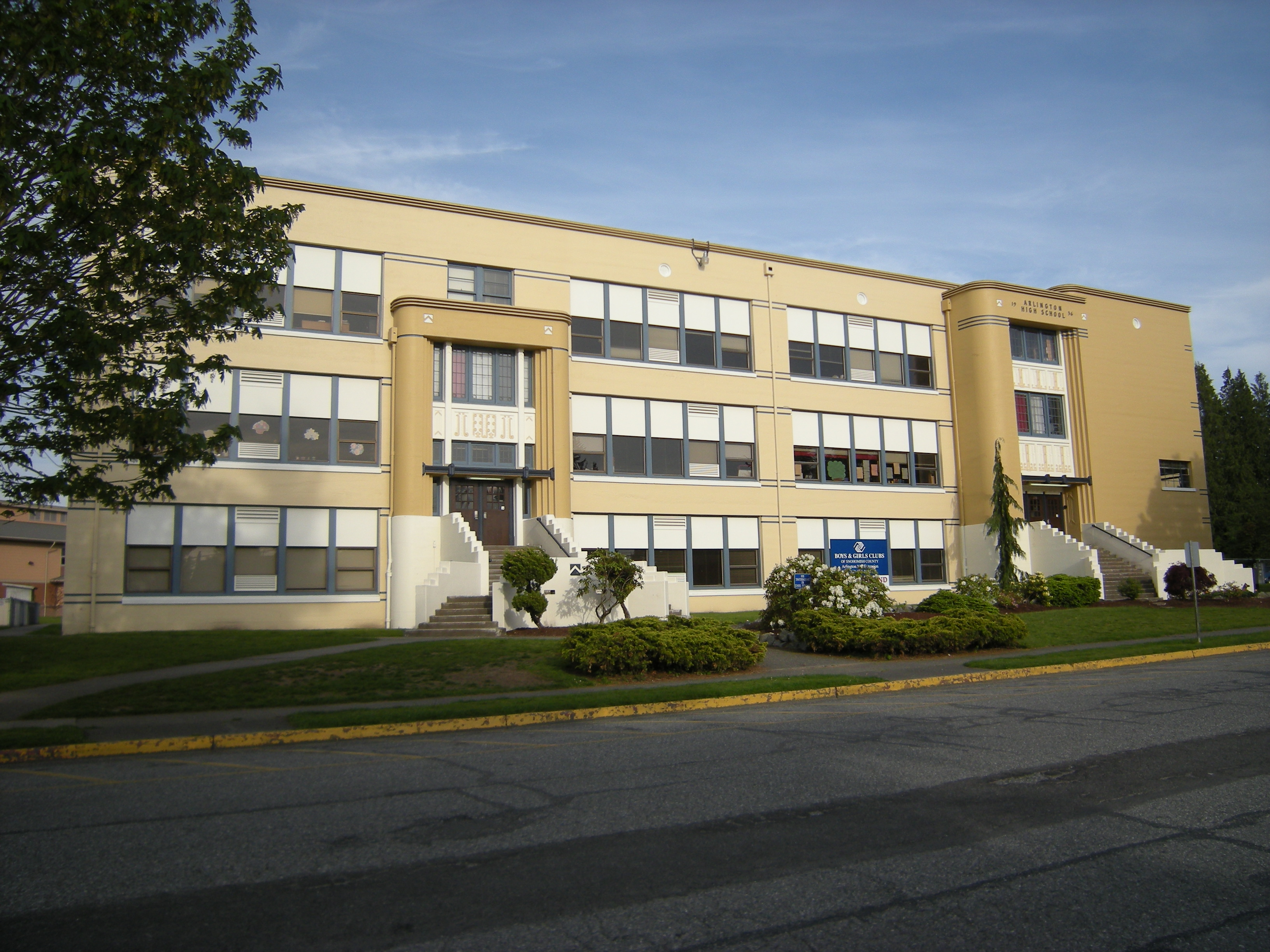
The former Arlington High School building, vacated in 2002

Public schools in Arlington are operated by the Arlington School District, which covers most of the incorporated city and also includes the outlying areas of Arlington Heights, Bryant, Getchell, and Sisco Heights. The district had an enrollment of approximately 5,528 students in 2014 and has nine total schools, including one high school, two middle schools, four elementary schools, and two alternative learning facilities. In the early 2000s, the school district opened four new schools to replace other facilities as part of a $54 million bond measure passed by Arlington voters in 2000. The Smokey Point neighborhood is served by the Lakewood School District, which is in unincorporated North Lakewood and served the area prior to its annexation by Arlington.

Arlington is located approximately 15 miles (24 km) away from the Everett Community College, its nearest post-secondary education institution, situated in northern Everett. The college has offered basic skills and job training courses at Arlington's Weston High School since 2016, including a branch of its Advanced Manufacturing Training & Education Center.

In 1966, the Smokey Point area was proposed as the location of a four-year public college, with 645 acres (261 ha) offered by the city of Arlington to the state government. The Washington State Legislature decided to build the college instead in Olympia, becoming The Evergreen State College. The Smokey Point area was again offered by Arlington and Marysville as the site of a University of Washington branch campus in the 2000s, but the project was put on hold and later declined by the state legislature in favor of a Washington State University branch campus in Everett.

== Infrastructure ==
=== Transportation ===
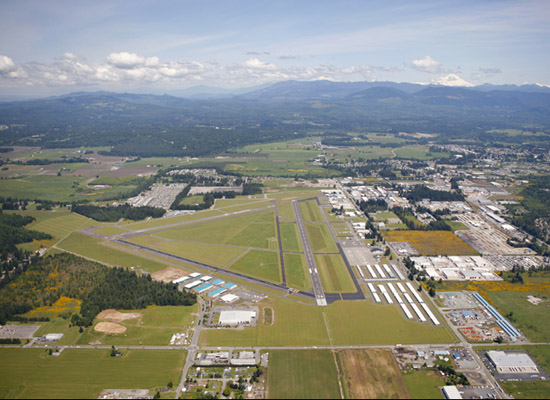
Aerial view of Arlington Municipal Airport

Downtown Arlington is located near the junction of State Route 9 and State Route 530, which serve as the main highways to the city. From Arlington, State Route 9 travels north into Skagit County and south to Snohomish; and State Route 530 travels west to an interchange with Interstate 5, the main north–south highway between Seattle and Vancouver, British Columbia, and east to Darrington. Within the city is an additional state highway, State Route 531, which connects Smokey Point, the municipal airport, and Gleneagle to Interstate 5 and State Route 9 in the southern part of the city. Other major arterial roads include Smokey Point Boulevard and 67th Avenue NE, which serve as north–south thoroughfares within Arlington.

Public transportation in Arlington is provided by Community Transit, a public transit authority that operates in most of Snohomish County. Community Transit runs all-day local bus service on one route from Downtown Arlington to Smokey Point, as well as four other routes to Marysville, Everett, Lake Stevens, Lynnwood, and Stanwood from a transit center in Smokey Point. Community Transit also provides local service from Darrington and express service to Lynnwood City Center station and the Boeing Everett Factory. The agency's microtransit service, Zip Shuttle, expanded to Arlington and Smokey Point in December 2024. Arlington has one active railroad, a 6.9-mile-long (11.1 km) spur line from Marysville to downtown Arlington operated by BNSF Railway (the successor to Burlington Northern). As part of the development of the Arlington Airport business park, BNSF Railway will build two rail spurs leading to the airport in the near future. Arlington does not have passenger rail service, but is near Amtrak stations in Everett and Stanwood.

Historically, Arlington developed along several railroads that have since been abandoned or re-purposed. The Seattle, Lake Shore and Eastern Railway, which spurred the establishment of Arlington in the 1880s, ran north–south through Arlington on its main line between Snohomish and the Canada–United States border. In 1892, it was acquired by the Northern Pacific Railway, which was acquired by Burlington Northern in 1970. Burlington Northern abandoned the railroad in 1972, favoring a parallel route to the west through Marysville, and it was converted into the Centennial Trail in the 1990s and 2000s. A Northern Pacific branch to Darrington, following the modern-day State Route 530, was built in 1901 and abandoned in 1990; the county government plans to use the right of way for the Whitehorse Trail, a multi-purpose trail.

The city of Arlington owns the Arlington Municipal Airport, located 3 miles (4.8 km) southwest of downtown Arlington. The airport is primarily used for general aviation and light business, and is home to 475 aircraft, including 10 helicopters, 20 gliders, and 23 ultra-light aircraft. Approximately 130 businesses are located on airport property, of which one-quarter are involved in aviation-related uses directly impacting the airport. In the 1990s, the airport was explored as a candidate for expansion into a regional airport to relieve Seattle–Tacoma International Airport. The plan was ultimately abandoned by 1996, as the Puget Sound Regional Council instead chose to construct a third runway at Seattle–Tacoma International Airport.

=== Utilities ===
Electric power in Arlington is provided by the Snohomish County Public Utility District (PUD), a consumer-owned public utility that purchases most of its electricity from the federal Bonneville Power Administration (BPA). The BPA operates the region's system of electrical transmission lines, including Path 3, a major national transmission corridor running along the eastern side of Arlington towards British Columbia. The PUD also operates a microgrid project in Arlington that comprises a three-acre (1.2 ha) solar array and battery system that stores up to 1 MWh of electricity. Cascade Natural Gas and Puget Sound Energy provide natural gas to Arlington residents and businesses north and south of State Route 531, respectively; two major north–south gas pipelines run through Arlington and are maintained by the Olympic Pipeline Company, a subsidiary of BP, and the Northwest Pipeline Company, a subsidiary of Williams Companies. Arlington is served by several telephone companies and internet service providers, including Comcast (Xfinity), Frontier Communications (including Verizon FiOS), and Wave Broadband.

The city of Arlington provides water and water treatment to approximately 5,548 customers within a service area covering 25.3 square miles (66 km^{2}) within the city limits and some surrounding areas. The city's water is sourced from groundwater deposits near Haller Park on the Stillaguamish River and near Arlington Municipal Airport, as well as water purchased from the Snohomish County PUD that is sourced from Spada Lake. The Smokey Point neighborhood is served by the City of Marysville's water system.

Wastewater and stormwater are collected and treated by the municipal government before being discharged into the Stillaguamish River basin. Arlington's municipal solid waste and single-stream recycling collection and disposal services are contracted by the municipal government to Waste Management; the Snohomish County government and Republic Services also operate a transfer station in Arlington.

=== Health care ===
Arlington is part of the Snohomish Public Hospital District No. 3, which operates the Cascade Valley Hospital, a 48-bed general hospital. The hospital was established in 1909 and was the last independent hospital in Snohomish County at the time of its acquisition in 2016. The city is also served by community clinics operated by Cascade Valley (and Skagit Regional Health) as well as The Everett Clinic and the Community Health Center of Snohomish County.

== Notable people ==
- Kenneth Boulton, pianist
- Bob Drewel, former County Executive
- McKenna Geer, Paralympian in shooting
- Celia M. Hunter, environmentalist and conservationist
- John Koster, former state legislator and County Councilmember
- Rick Larsen, U.S. Congressman
- Erik Norgard, American football player
- Ryan Walker, baseball player
