= Cascade Valley Hospital =

- Skagit Regional Health
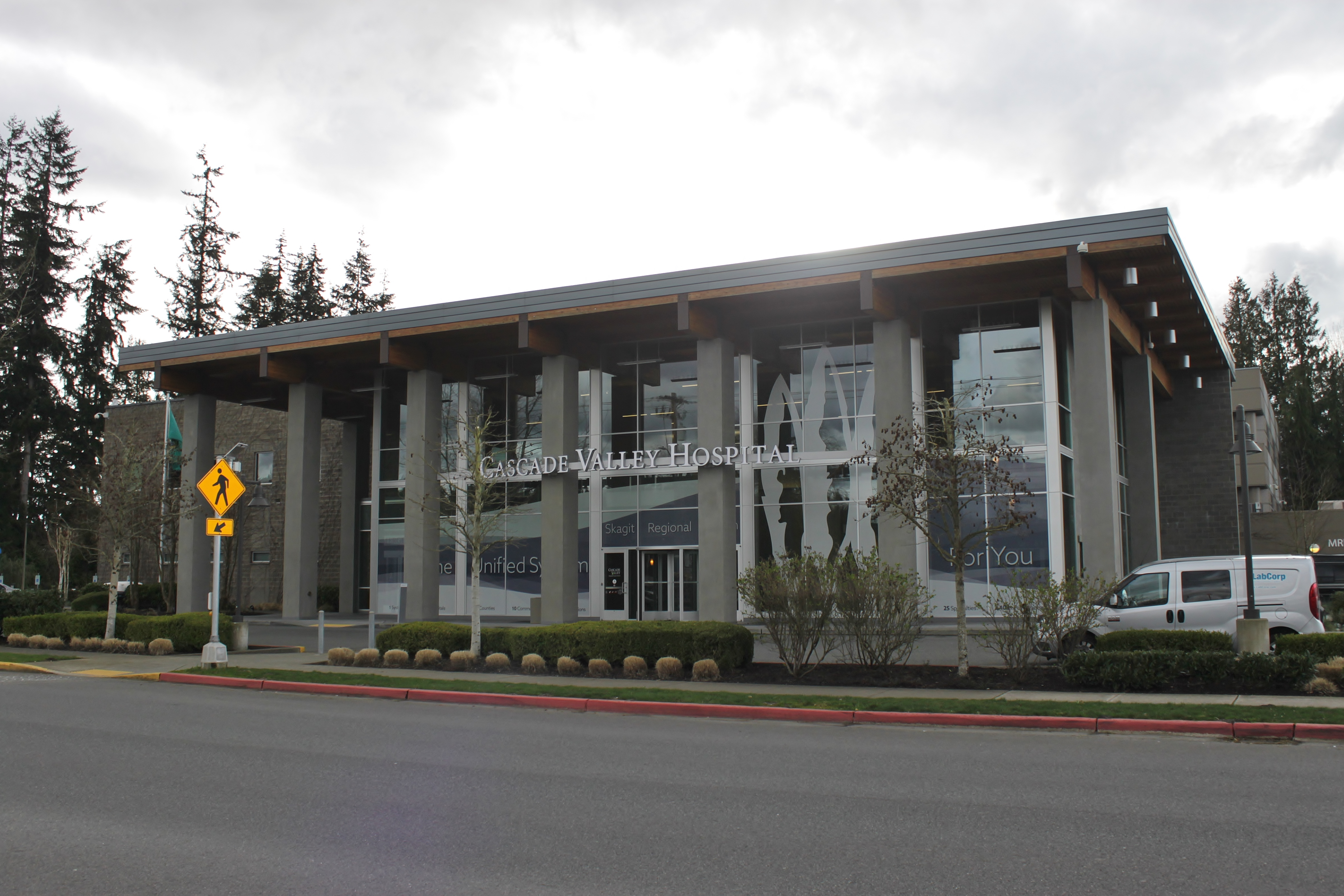

Geography
- Location: Arlington, Washington
- Coordinates: 48°11′19.9″N 122°07′06.3″W

Organisation
- Care system: Public
- Type: General

Services
- Emergency department: Yes; Level IV trauma center
- Beds: 48

Links
- Website: cascadevalley.org

The Cascade Valley Hospital is a general hospital in Arlington, Washington, operated by Skagit Regional Health. The 48-bed hospital is located south of downtown Arlington on a 17-acre (6.9 ha) property; Cascade Valley also operates five medical clinics and a freestanding ambulatory surgery center.

== History ==
The Arlington General Hospital was built in 1909 as the first hospital-specific building in Snohomish County. A new hospital, named Cascade Valley, was built at the current campus in 1958, and was incorporated into the Snohomish County Public Hospital District No. 3 in 1964. The hospital campus was rebuilt in 1987, and the district later expanded to cover most of northern Snohomish County in 1996.

A major $45 million renovation was completed in 2010, adding a new building and remodeling the hospital to expand emergency services to accommodate a growing number of patients. A helipad was built in 2015 to accommodate airlifted patients.

In the 2010s, Cascade Valley remained as the last independent hospital in Snohomish County. The hospital announced in 2013 that it would merge with PeaceHealth, but the merger was cancelled by PeaceHealth over issues with electronic records. After evaluating new partners, including UW Medicine and Providence Health & Services, Cascade Valley announced in 2016 that it would merge with Skagit Regional Health, the operator of Skagit Valley Hospital in Mount Vernon. The two hospitals had already partnered in 2011 to build a medical clinic in Smokey Point, near Arlington, and Skagit has run outpatient chemotherapy programs for Cascade in the past.

A three-story expansion with 30,000 square feet (2,800 m^{2}) of space began construction in July 2026 and is scheduled to open in late 2027. It was jointly funded by Skagit Regional Health and Stilly Valley Healthy Connections (both public hospital districts) and will house facilities for urgent care, family medicine, and lab services.

== Facilities ==
Cascade Valley Hospital operates one general hospital in Arlington, and five clinics in Darrington, Granite Falls, and Smokey Point.
