= Arlington School District =

Public school district in Snohomish County, Washington

Arlington School District No. 16 is a public school district in Snohomish County, Washington, based in the city of Arlington.

The district includes the majority of Arlington and a small piece of Marysville. It also includes the Arlington Heights, Bryant, Oso, and Silvana census-designated places, as well as portions of the CDPs of Sisco Heights and Sunday Lake.

As of January 2011, the Arlington School District has about 5,400 students and 530 staff at 10 schools. These include the Historic Trafton Elementary School (see references below), Weston High School (alternative program), Apple pre-school, and Stillaguamish Valley School (home-school support).

== Schools ==
=== High schools ===
- Arlington High School
- Weston High School

=== Middle schools ===
- Post Middle School
- Haller Middle School

=== Elementary schools ===
- Eagle Creek Elementary School
- Kent Prairie Elementary School
- Presidents Elementary School
- Pioneer Elementary School
- Trafton Elementary School
- Stillaguamish Valley School
- Arlington Science Focus School
