= Skagit Regional Health =

Regional health care system in Washington, U.S.

Skagit Regional Health is a health care system based in northwestern Washington state. It is headquartered in Mount Vernon, Washington.

== History ==
Skagit Regional Health was formed on July 1, 2010, by a merger of the Skagit Valley Hospital and Skagit Valley Medical Center.

On June 1, 2016, Skagit Regional Health signed a 30-year lease with Arlington-based Cascade Valley Hospital to take over operations and effectively combine the two systems.

== Facilities ==
- Cascade Valley Hospital, Arlington
- Skagit Valley Hospital, Mount Vernon
