= Arlington High School (Washington) =

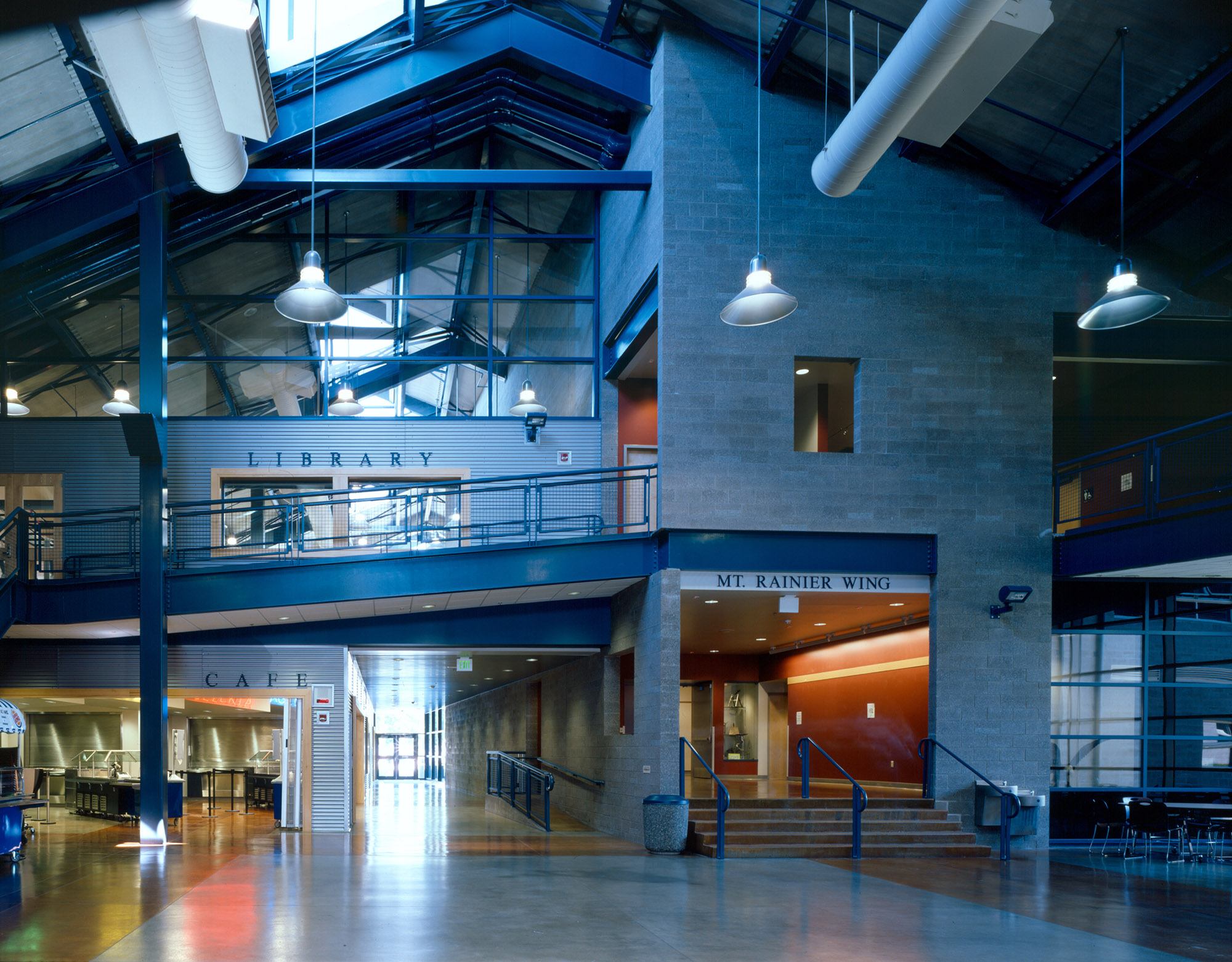
- Arlington High School entrance

Location
- 18821 Crown Ridge Blvd; Arlington, Washington 98223; 48°10′00″N 122°06′55″W

Information
- Type: Public secondary school
- Motto: Home of the Eagles
- School district: Arlington School District
- Principal: Marilee Herman (2024)
- Enrollment: 1,622 (2023-2024)
- Colors: Navy & Gold
- Nickname: Eagles
- Rivals: Stanwood (Stilly Cup)
- Yearbook: The Stillaguamish Trail
- Website: Arlington High School

Arlington High School is a public high school located in Arlington, Washington and is home to the Eagles. The enrollment was 1,622 for the 2023–2024 school year. This school was built in 2002 after years of unsuccessful building bonds. The grand opening, after five years of raising funds, was on May 31, 2003.

== Sports ==
Arlington's rivals are the Stanwood Spartans, who they play annually in football for the Stilly Cup.

In 2010, the Arlington Eagles won the WESCO championship against Jackson High School 42–21. In 2013, the Arlington Eagles won the softball state title.

== FIRST Robotics ==
Arlington High School is the home school to Neobots (FTC: 9330, FRC: 2903), a FIRST Robotics program with their rookie year in 2009. Neobots went to FIRST World Championship in 2017 for FIRST Steamworks.

== Sno-Isle Skills and Tech Center ==
Arlington Public Schools participates in Sno-Isle Skills and Tech Center, which is one of many such school districts. Sno-Isle allows students to participate in industry and college level classes involving Electronics, Engineering, Mechanics, Culinary, Arts, Construction and other industry related skills.

== Demographics ==
As of 2018, the demographic breakdown of Arlington High School ethnicities is:

- 79% White
- 11% Hispanic
- 2% Asian
- 1% American Indian or Alaskan Native
- 1% Black

== Old Arlington High School Building ==
The old Arlington High School building is now used as a Kids Kloset providing clothes to the underprivileged. The building is also used as a quarters for Arlington Public School.

== Notable alumni ==
- Ryan Walker (baseball), pitcher for the San Francisco Giants
