= Arlington Heights, Washington =

- CDP
- Location of Arlington Heights, Washington
- Coordinates: 48°12′31″N 122°3′11″W
- Country: United States
- State: Washington
- County: Snohomish

Area
  - Total: 11.4 sq mi (29.4 km^{2})
  - Land: 11.4 sq mi (29.4 km^{2})
  - Water: 0 sq mi (0.0 km^{2})
- Elevation: 308 ft (94 m)

Population (2020)
  - Total: 2,477
  - Density: 218/sq mi (84.3/km^{2})
- Time zone: UTC-8 (Pacific (PST))
  - Summer (DST): UTC-7 (PDT)
- ZIP Code: 98223
- Area code(s): 360, 564
- FIPS code: 53-02620
- GNIS feature ID: 1515948

Arlington Heights is a census-designated place (CDP) in Snohomish County, Washington, United States. As of the 2020 census, the population was 2,477, up from 2,284 at the 2010 census.

== Geography ==
Arlington Heights is located at 48°12′31″N 122°3′11″W (48.208682, -122.052999).

According to the United States Census Bureau, the CDP has a total area of 11.3 square miles (29 km^{2}), all of it land.

== Demographics ==
Historical population
Census	Pop.	Note	%±
2000	2,510		—
2010	2,284		−9.0%
2020	2,477		8.5%
U.S. Decennial Census; 1970 1980 1990; 2000 2010

Arlington Heights first appeared as a census designated place in the 2000 U.S. census.

=== Racial and ethnic composition ===
Arlington Heights CDP, Washington – Racial and ethnic composition Note: the US Census treats Hispanic/Latino as an ethnic category. This table excludes Latinos from the racial categories and assigns them to a separate category. Hispanics/Latinos may be of any race.
Race / Ethnicity (NH = Non-Hispanic)	Pop 2000	Pop 2010	Pop 2020	% 2000	% 2010	% 2020
White alone (NH)	2,374	2,118	2,156	94.58%	92.73%	87.04%
Black or African American alone (NH)	6	5	3	0.24%	0.22%	0.12%
Native American or Alaska Native alone (NH)	10	18	15	0.40%	0.79%	0.61%
Asian alone (NH)	20	22	23	0.80%	0.96%	0.93%
Native Hawaiian or Pacific Islander alone (NH)	0	2	3	0.00%	0.09%	0.12%
Other race alone (NH)	9	5	9	0.36%	0.22%	0.36%
Mixed race or Multiracial (NH)	47	50	178	1.87%	2.19%	7.19%
Hispanic or Latino (any race)	44	64	90	1.75%	2.80%	3.63%
Total	2,510	2,284	2,477	100.00%	100.00%	100.00%

=== 2000 census ===
As of the census of 2000, there were 2,510 people, 838 households, and 682 families living in the CDP. The population density was 221.3 people per square mile (85.4 people/km^{2}). There were 859 housing units at an average density of 75.7 per square mile (29.2/km^{2}). The racial makeup of the CDP was 95.70% White, 0.24% African American, 0.40% Native American, 0.80% Asian, 0.92% from other races, and 1.95% from two or more races. Hispanic or Latino of any race were 1.75% of the population.

There were 838 households, out of which 39.0% had children under the age of 18 living with them, 70.9% were married couples living together, 6.9% had a female householder with no husband present, and 18.6% were non-families. 13.7% of all households were made up of individuals, and 4.5% had someone living alone who was 65 years of age or older. The average household size was 3.00 and the average family size was 3.27.

In the CDP, the age distribution of the population shows 29.5% under the age of 18, 7.0% from 18 to 24, 28.1% from 25 to 44, 26.2% from 45 to 64, and 9.2% who were 65 years of age or older. The median age was 38 years. For every 100 females, there were 101.9 males. For every 100 females age 18 and over, there were 96.8 males.

The median income for a household in the CDP was $60,518, and the median income for a family was $60,590. Males had a median income of $42,440 versus $31,250 for females. The per capita income for the CDP was $22,107. About 8.6% of families and 8.6% of the population were below the poverty line, including 14.1% of those under age 18 and 6.5% of those age 65 or over.

== Education ==
The community is served by the Arlington School District.
