= Arlington Municipal Airport (Washington) =

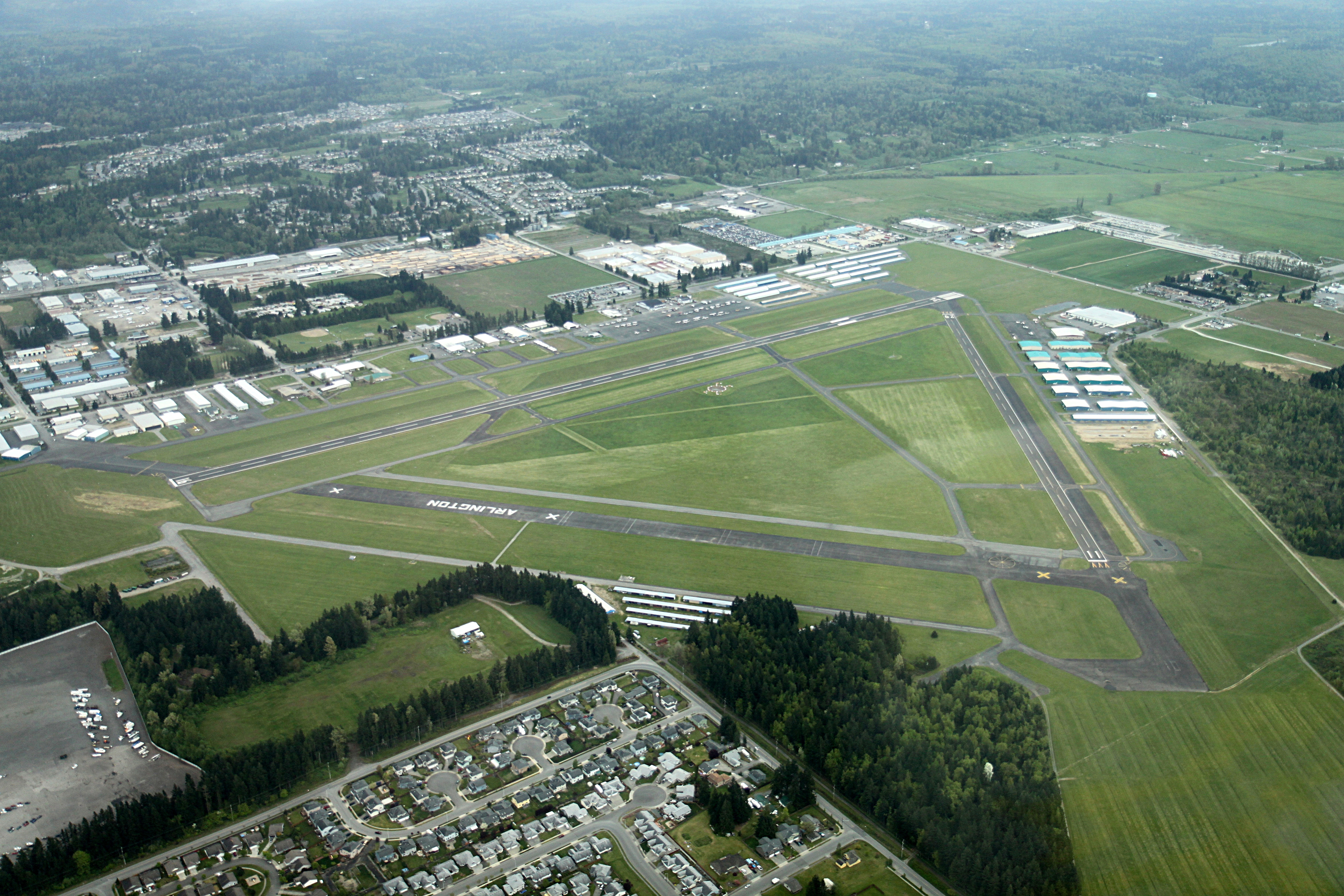
- IATA: none; ICAO: KAWO; FAA LID: AWO

Summary
- Airport type: Public
- Owner/Operator: City of Arlington
- Serves: Arlington, Washington
- Location: 3 nm southwest of the CBD
- Elevation AMSL: 142 ft (43 m)
- Coordinates: 48°09′39″N 122°09′32″W
- Website: arlingtonwa.gov
- Interactive map of Arlington Municipal Airport

Runways
Direction	Length		Surface
Direction	ft	m	Surface
16/34	5,332	1,625	Asphalt
11/29	3,498	1,066	Asphalt
16G/34G	4,000	1,219	Turf
11/29	1,400	427	Turf
8U/26U	1,700	518	Turf

Statistics
- Aircraft operations (2015): 133,492
- Based aircraft (2017): 513
- Source: Federal Aviation Administration and Arlington Airport

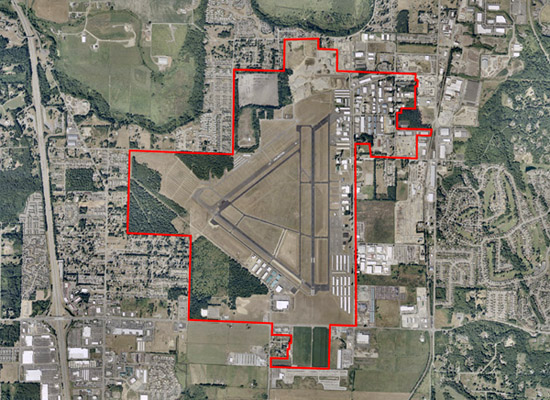
Plan view of Arlington Municipal Airport with boundaries outlined in red

Arlington Municipal Airport (ICAO: KAWO, FAA LID: AWO) is a public airport located three miles (5 km) southwest of the central business district of Arlington, a city in Snohomish County, Washington, United States. It is owned and operated by the City of Arlington.

Many U.S. airports use the same three-letter location identifier for the FAA and IATA. However, this airport is assigned AWO by the FAA but has no designation from the IATA. It is included in the Federal Aviation Administration (FAA) National Plan of Integrated Airport Systems for 2017–2021, in which it is categorized as a regional general aviation facility.

== History ==
Construction of Arlington Municipal Airport was approved on February 23, 1934. The first airplane took off on June 13, 1934, and the airport was officially dedicated on July 4, 1935.

U.S. Naval Auxiliary Air Station, Arlington, Washington, was established in 1940, when the United States Navy leased the airstrip from the town of Arlington to supplement training facilities at Seattle. However, no important construction took place until 1942. In that year, the Navy permitted the Army to develop the field as a strategic base for medium bombers to counteract the Japanese invasion of the Aleutian Islands. Early in 1943, the Japanese threat in the Aleutians diminished and at the same time the Naval carrier program required additional training fields within reach of gunnery ranges in the Puget Sound area. By August 14, 1945, Arlington was a well-balanced station equipped to support two light carrier air groups for either day or night operations. No major projects were pending at that time, and it was felt that none remained to be undertaken unless a significant addition was made to the functions of the station.

At the close of World War II, the U.S. military reduced funding and operations around the United States. On October 10, 1945, notification was received from the Chief of Naval Operations that Arlington would be reduced to a caretaker status on December 1, 1945.

The airfield and hangar complex has been listed on the National Register of Historic Places since 1995. In 2021, one of the abandoned runways was converted into a mass COVID-19 vaccination site with a drive-thru tent.

=== Today ===
Currently, the airport is host to several businesses making significant contributions to the aviation industry. Some activities include flight instruction, emergency parachute manufacturing, kit plane and sailplane sales/manufacturing, historic and decommissioned aircraft restoration, aircraft upholstery, aircraft cover manufacturing, and much more. The airport is home to corporate & decommissioned military jets, vintage aircraft, experimental aircraft, aerobatic aircraft, helicopters, gliders, and ultralights. The grassroots aviation presence at Arlington is very strong, rivaling that of many larger airports across the United States, including nearby Paine Field (KPAE).

The City continues to support general aviation through financing, planning and development. During the 1995 Master Plan update, the City planned and developed the airport specifically for general aviation use. Items specific to general aviation included in the 2002 Master Plan Update were additional T-hangars, a 100' by 1,000' (50' pavement / 50' turf) ultralight runway, and a compass rose. There are approximately 580 aircraft based at the airport, which has 400 public hangars and 77 private hangars.

In the 1990s, the airport was selected by the Puget Sound Regional Council as a candidate for expansion into a regional airport to relieve Seattle–Tacoma International Airport. The council decided instead to construct a third runway at Sea-Tac in 1996, leaving Arlington to redevelop its airport for general aviation. A 124-acre (50 ha) business park was created on the west side of the airport in 2002 and includes offices, hangars, and light manufacturing. In 2019, the city began lobbying for a 677-foot (206 m) runway extension to support larger airplanes and anticipated growth.

From 2009 to 2014, the airport was home to the Washington State Department of Transportation's Aviation Division.

In April 2014, the airport saw the arrival of President Barack Obama in Marine One, the presidential helicopter, after flying from Paine Field in Everett. The President then continued by motorcade to Oso, scene of a fatal mudslide.

Eviation Aviation is based at the airport and uses it for development of its electric commuter model, the Eviation Alice, which began testing in 2021.

== Facilities and aircraft ==
Arlington Municipal Airport covers an area of 1,189 acres (481 ha) which contains two asphalt paved runways: 16/34 measuring 5,332 x 100 ft (1,625 x 30 m) and 11/29 measuring 3,498 x 75 ft (1,066 x 23 m). A third paved runway on the north of the airport is abandoned. The airport also maintains three unmarked turf runways for used by gliders and ultralight aircraft.

For the 12-month period ending December 31, 2015, the airport had 133,492 aircraft operations, an average of 365 per day: 98% general aviation, 2% air taxi and <1% military. In July 2017, there were 513 aircraft based at Arlington: 366 single-engine, 19 multi-engine, 11 jet, 12 helicopter, 45 glider and 60 ultralight.

== Accidents and incidents ==
- On May 14, 2011, the pilot of a lightweight CZAW SportCruiser aircraft died after his plane burst into flames shortly after landing at Arlington.

== See also ==
- List of airports in Washington
