= Getchell, Washington =

Unincorporated community in Washington, United States

- Unincorporated community
- Location within Washington (state) Location within the United States
- Coordinates: 48°04′19″N 122°05′49″W
- Country: United States
- State: Washington
- County: Snohomish
- Time zone: UTC-8 (Pacific (PST))
  - Summer (DST): UTC-7 (PDT)

Getchell is an unincorporated community in Snohomish County, in the U.S. state of Washington.

== History ==
Getchell was platted in the 1890s by Lysander W. Getchell, and named for him. A post office called Getchell was established in 1890, and remained in operation until 1918.
