= Pacific Northwest University of Health Sciences =

Medical school in Yakima, Washington, US

- Type: Private medical school
- Established: 2005
- Budget: $33.0 million
- President: Michael H. Mittelman
- Provost: Lori Fulton (interim)
- Academic staff: 51
- Administrative staff: 69
- Students: 650
- Location: Yakima, Washington, United States; 46.6055°N 120.4564°W
- Campus: Urban (mid-sized) 64 acres
- Colors: Pacific Blue; Forrest Green; Vineyard Green; New Leaf Green; Cloud Blue
- Website: www.pnwu.edu

Pacific Northwest University of Health Sciences (PNWU) is a private medical school in Yakima, Washington, United States. The university focuses on educating health care professionals to serve "rural and medically underserved communities throughout the Northwest". Founded in 2005, the university's inaugural program was the first new medical school to open in the Pacific Northwest in sixty years. PNWU grants the Doctor of Osteopathic Medicine (D.O.) degree and graduated its first class of physicians in May 2012. Since then, PNWU has continued to expand and now includes the School of Physical Therapy (SOPT), School of Occupational Therapy (SOT), and a School of Dental Medicine (SDM).

== History ==
The Pacific Northwest University of Health Sciences opened in 2005, after planning and fundraising to open a new osteopathic medical school in Washington State. In 2007, PNWU received provisional accreditation. In 2008, the first courses began, and the university's main building, Butler-Haney Hall, opened at a cost of $13 million. In 2009, the university received a $400,000 federal grant to expand the College of Allied Health Sciences. In 2012, the inaugural class of 69 students graduated, earning the Doctor of Osteopathic Medicine degree. In 2021, the inaugural Master of Arts in Medical Sciences (MAMS) class began with approximately 40 students. The School of Physical Therapy opened in 2022 and the School of Occupational Therapy opened in 2023. The School of Dental Medicine is accepted its first class in 2024.

Initially, PNWU encountered challenges finding rotation sites for medical students, as hospitals already offering training to students from the University of Washington refused additional students. The school now has established rotation sites for its medical students across Washington, Oregon, Idaho, Alaska, and Montana.

== Academics ==
* Matriculants from PNWU's 5-state catchment area - 70% (2023-24)
	Matriculants
Alaska	2%
Idaho	3.6%
Montana	1.5%
Oregon	8.6%
Washington	54.3%

The largest program at the Pacific Northwest University of Health Sciences is the College of Osteopathic Medicine (COM), which grants the Doctor of Osteopathic Medicine (DO) degree. It is a four-year program. Years 1 and 2 of the DO program consist primarily of classroom-based learning in Yakima, which focuses on gross anatomy in a live cadaver lab, Osteopathic Manipulative Treatment, the basic sciences, and an in-depth study of the body systems. Years 3 and 4 of the DO program consist of clinical rotations in off-site communities. The school currently has 18 sites for clinical rotations over the five-state region of Alaska, Idaho, Montana, Oregon, and Washington.

The university also provides a one-year Master of Arts in Medical Sciences, two-year Master of Science in Occupational Therapy, three-year Doctor of Physical Therapy, and a four-year Doctor of Dental Medicine programs. PNWU is partnered with Washington State University and hosts WSU Nursing and PharmD students on its campus.

== Campus ==
Butler-Haney Hall is the home of the College of Osteopathic Medicine and provides an anatomy lab, OMT and physical skills lab, large classroom auditoriums, bench research space, and a library. A new addition to Butler-Haney Hall was completed in 2013. Cadwell Center opened in January 2011, and provides classrooms, study space and a lab for the WSU PharmD students. University Conference Center was complete by the spring of 2015 and provides additional classroom, conference and study space. In 2016, PNWU purchased the Iron Horse Lodge, where the administration is currently housed. Watson Hall opened its doors in 2019 and is the home of the School of Physical Therapy and WSU College of Nursing - Yakima. In 2023, the Multicare Learning Center was opened. The 53,000 square foot building contains in-patient and out-patient simulation labs, an occupational therapy performance lab, a pediatric sensory gym, individual and group study areas, and social gathering spaces. Starting February 2024, the Delta Dental Equity Hall will open and house the dental program.

== Students ==
PNWU Student Demographics 23-24
	Students
American Indian or Alaska Native	0.5%
Asian	27.9%
Black/African American	0.5%
Hispanic	15.2%
Native Hawaiian or Other Pacific Islander	0.5%
Two or more	6.1%
White/Non-Hispanic	49.2%
Undeclared	0.5%

There are a total of 650 students as of Fall 2023. Of the 2023 matriculants, 52.8% are female and 46.7% are male. The average age is 26, 23% are from a rural area and 29% are from medically underserved areas.

Students at PNWU participate in a number of clubs on campus and an active student government association. Students can volunteer at the Union Gospel Mission Medical Clinic and with the Roots to Wings co-mentorship program. There are also research opportunities with faculty and the Office of Scholarly Activity.

== Accreditation ==
Pacific Northwest University of Health Sciences is accredited by the Northwest Commission on Colleges and Universities and the College of Osteopathic Medicine is accredited by the American Osteopathic Association's Commission on Osteopathic College Accreditation.

== See also ==
- List of medical schools in the United States
