= Monroe High School (Washington) =

Coordinates: 47°50′36″N 122°00′36″W

Location
- 17001 Tester Road; Monroe, Washington 98272; United States

Information
- Type: Public
- School district: Monroe School District
- Principal: Brett Wille
- Staff: 71.83 (on an FTE basis)
- Grades: 9–12
- Enrollment: 1,491 (2023–2024)
- Student to teacher ratio: 20.76
- Colors: Orange & Black
- Mascot: Bearcats
- Website: www.monroe.wednet.edu/mhs

Monroe High School is a public high school in Monroe, Washington, and a part of the Monroe School District. Since 1999, the school has been located on Tester Road. Formerly, it was located on Main Street in downtown Monroe.

The school district, of which this is the sole comprehensive high school, includes almost all of Monroe, as well as most of High Bridge and Woods Creek; and parts of Chain Lake, Maltby, Monroe North, and Three Lakes.

== Monroe Sports Arena ==
The Monroe Sports Arena is a 2,000 seat multi-purpose arena located on the campus of the school. It was home to the Snohomish County Explosion of the International Basketball League. The Monroe High School gymnasium was renamed the Monroe Sports Arena in 2008 after $10,000 worth of renovations made for the IBL season.

== Mascot ==
Monroe High School's mascot is "Benny the Bearcat". The term "Bearcat" was originally the nickname of the amateur turned semiprofessional boxer. Dode "Bearcat" Bercot. In the 1920s and 30s, this boxer from Monroe fought in over 100 main event fights and won 42 by knockout. However, before turning pro, Bercot's career was cut short after an opponent put a thumb in Bercot's eye, leaving him partially blinded for life. He was given the nickname "Bearcat" because he was said to be strong as a bear and fast as a cat. The school colors are orange and black.

== Activities ==
The school boasts a wide variety of extracurricular activities. Examples of these are the academic quiz competition teams, Hi-Q and Knowledge Bowl, and the community service-based Key Club. In 2011 and 2017, Monroe's Hi-Q team won the Washington State Championship and participated in the Hi-Q National Championship.

The most well-known and largest club at Monroe is DECA. The Monroe High School DECA Chapter was the third largest DECA chapter in the United States during the 1990s. DECA is a national marketing club and Monroe sends multiple students to the Washington State (SCDC) and National (ICDC) competitions every year. Monroe DECA has also proven to be a large part of the high school's community service efforts, having helped fund and maintain the Monroe Miracle League Field. Each year, Monroe DECA students serve as base-buddies for the players in the Miracle League games.

== Sports ==
Monroe competes in WIAA Class 3A and is a member of the Wesco League in District One.

=== State championships ===
- Boys basketball: 1952, 1953
- Girls golf: 1999, 2000
- Boys soccer: 2001

== Notable alumni ==
- Ian Parmley, former Major League Baseball outfielder
- Benson Boone, singer and songwriter
- Efton Chism, college football wide receiver
