= Monroe School District (Washington) =

School district in Washington, United States

Monroe School District is a school district headquartered in Monroe, Washington.

The district includes almost all of Monroe, as well as most of High Bridge and Woods Creek; and parts of Chain Lake, Maltby, Monroe North, and Three Lakes.

== History ==
Justin Blasko's term as superintendent ended on July 31, 2022 when he resigned. In October 2023, Jordan Hansen of the Everett Herald stated that the district was still "reeling from the resignation".

In the summer of 2023, Shawn Woodward was scheduled to become superintendent. After beginning his term, he set out to visit schools for 100 days so he could generate a strategic plan which would be implemented for a decade.

== Schools ==
High schools:

- Monroe High School (Monroe)
- Leaders in Learning High School (Monroe)

Middle schools:

- Hidden River Middle School (Maltby CDP, Snohomish address)
- Park Place Middle School (Monroe)

Elementary schools:

- Chain Lake Elementary School (Chain Lake CDP, Snohomish address)
- Fryelands Elementary School (Monroe)
- Maltby Elementary School (Maltby CDP, Snohomish address)
- Salem Woods Elementary School (Chain Lake CDP, Monroe address)
- Frank Wagner Elementary School (Monroe)

Other:

- Sky Valley Education Center (Monroe)
