= Monroe, Washington =

City in Washington, United States

Monroe
- City
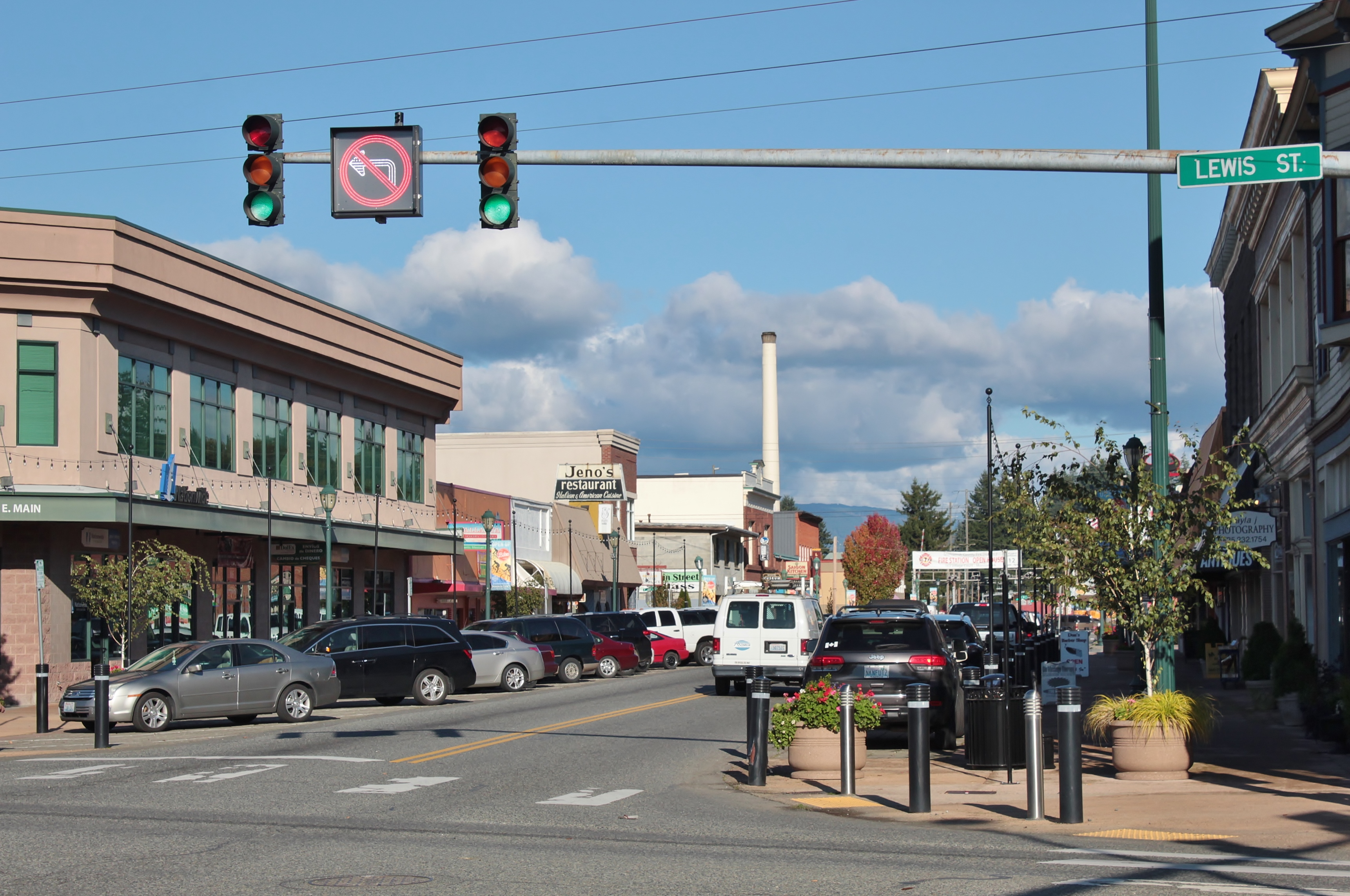
- Main Street and Lewis Street in downtown Monroe

- Flag
- Interactive map of Monroe
- Coordinates: 47°51′28″N 121°59′18″W
- Country: United States
- State: Washington
- County: Snohomish
- Founded: 1864
- Incorporated: December 20, 1902

Government
  - Type: Mayor–council
  - Mayor: Patsy Cudaback

Area
  - Total: 6.16 sq mi (15.95 km^{2})
  - Land: 6.10 sq mi (15.79 km^{2})
  - Water: 0.062 sq mi (0.16 km^{2})
- Elevation: 72 ft (22 m)

Population (2020)
  - Total: 19,699
  - Estimate (2024): 19,927
  - Density: 3,243.7/sq mi (1,252.39/km^{2})
- Time zone: UTC-8 (Pacific (PST))
  - Summer (DST): UTC-7 (PDT)
- ZIP Code: 98272
- Area code: 360, 564
- FIPS code: 53-46685
- GNIS feature ID: 1523319
- Website: www.monroewa.gov

Monroe is a city in Snohomish County, Washington, United States. It is located near the Cascade foothills at the confluence of the Skykomish and Snoqualmie rivers, which form the Snohomish River. The city is part of the Seattle metropolitan area and is 30 miles (48 km) northeast of Seattle. Monroe's population was 19,699 as of the 2020 census.

The town of Park Place was originally founded in 1864 at the river confluence and was among several existing settlements in the Tualco Valley. The confluence site was previously a trading post used by the indigenous Skykomish people. Park Place was renamed to Monroe in 1890 to honor U.S. President James Monroe, and was moved northeast to be near the tracks of the Great Northern Railway, which was constructed in 1892. Monroe was incorporated in 1902 and was selected as the home of a major condensed milk plant and the state reformatory.

The city became a suburban bedroom community in the late 20th century, serving commuters to Everett, Seattle, and the Eastside. It is home to the Monroe Correctional Complex, which absorbed the original reformatory in 1998, and the Evergreen State Fair, which runs annually in late summer. Monroe is located at the junction of two major highways, U.S. Route 2 and State Route 522, which were expanded in the late 20th century to serve commuters.

== History ==
=== Origins and establishment of Park Place ===
The confluence of the Skykomish and Snoqualmie rivers had originally belonged to the indigenous Skykomish tribe, who predominantly occupied the area between modern-day Monroe and Index. The confluence itself was known as Tualco (Lushootseed: squa'lxo), and a nearby Skykomish village named S'dodohobc acted as a trade post between several Coast Salish groups. A separate settlement near modern-day Monroe was used by the S'dodohobc band of the Snohomish people. The land around the confluence was cleared into a prairie and used to cultivate berries, hazelnuts, and other plants. The Skykomish were among the tribes to sign the Treaty of Point Elliott in 1855, effectively ceding their traditional territories, including the Tualco and confluence areas.

The area around modern-day Monroe was surveyed by George B. McClellan and the U.S. Army Corps of Engineers during their expedition to find a suitable pass for a railroad across the Cascade Mountains. The Treaty of Point Elliott was not fully ratified until 1859, but the first American settlers had already arrived and claimed squatters rights to homestead in the Skykomish Valley. Robert Smallman, an English immigrant, arrived in 1855 and was the first to homestead on the land around modern-day Monroe. He was followed by Henry McClurg, an appointed county commissioner, who settled in the area with his wife Martha in 1860. McClurg later founded the settlement of Park Place in 1864, on a site one mile (1.6 km) west of modern-day downtown Monroe. Two other settlers arrived in 1860: Salem Woods, who claimed a small prairie to the northeast of Tualco and was later elected county sheriff; and Charles Harriman, a territorial legislator who settled in Park Place.

Park Place and Tualco, located on opposite sides of the Skykomish River, grew with the arrival of more settlers in the 1860s and 1870s. A local school district, the second in the county, was established in 1869 by McClurg, and Park Place gained a post office in 1877 with Woods as postmaster. A ferry crossing the Skykomish River was established in 1882, several years prior to the start of regular steamship service on the river as far east as Sultan. The first roads in the area were surveyed in 1882, including an 11-mile (18 km) wagon road connecting Park Place to Snohomish in the west. During the 1880s, settlers in Park Place and Tualco received their first shipment of dairy cattle and also began planting hops, which would briefly become a cash crop until the arrival of the hop aphid and economic panic of the 1890s ruined the harvest.

=== Renaming and relocation ===
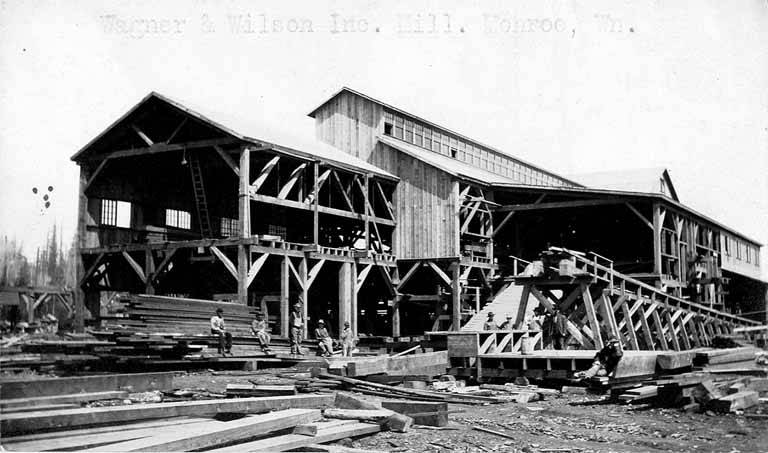
The Wagner and Wilson sawmill, one of the largest in Monroe at the beginning of the 20th century

The original Park Place post office and general store were abandoned and replaced by a new building that opened in 1890. John Vanasdlen, operator of new store, petitioned for the reopening of the post office but was rejected by the U.S. Post Office Department, which only allowed a single-word name for new offices. "Monroe" was chosen by Vanasdlen, with the input of McClurg, to honor of U.S. President James Monroe. The new post office for Monroe was granted by the U.S. Post Office Department on March 19, 1890.

The Great Northern Railway chose a route over Stevens Pass in the late 1880s for its transcontinental railroad connecting Seattle to St. Paul, Minnesota, bringing new development to the Skykomish Valley. Monroe at Park Place was platted in 1890 and gained several new businesses, including a blacksmith, grocery store, a second hotel, and a butcher. The final survey for Great Northern in 1891 placed the railroad tracks one mile (1.6 km) northeast of Park Place, bypassing the settlement in favor of a straighter alignment to cross the Snohomish River south of downtown Snohomish.

The railroad built a small depot named "Wales" on the 40-acre (16 ha) homestead of Jack Stretch, who platted a settlement on the north side of the tracks that he named "Tye City" for Great Northern's locating engineer George Tye. Great Northern completed their railroad through the Skykomish Valley in January 1893, following additional work near Snohomish to rebuild a bridge that had been destroyed in a flood. In late 1892 and early 1893, several merchants in Park Place moved their buildings to the south side of Tye City using teams of oxen, horses, and a steam thresher. After the relocation of Vanasdlen's general store and post office, the settlement became known as Monroe.

The completion of the railroad attracted lumber operations to the Monroe area, boosted by the opening of the first shingle mill in 1894 and the first sawmill on Woods Creek in 1897. A bridge across the Skykomish River was opened in 1894 to replace the ferry and the town's first church was established two years later. The county government chose a 40-acre (16 ha) site north of Monroe for a 20-bed poor farm at the modern-day site of the Evergreen State Fairgrounds; it later became the Valley General Hospital. A cooperative of Monroe-area farmers built the city's first creamery in 1895, which was destroyed in a fire four years later and later rebuilt. By the end of the decade, Monroe had also gained a new school building, telephone service, a local newspaper, a full-time doctor, and paved sidewalks.

=== Incorporation and new industries ===
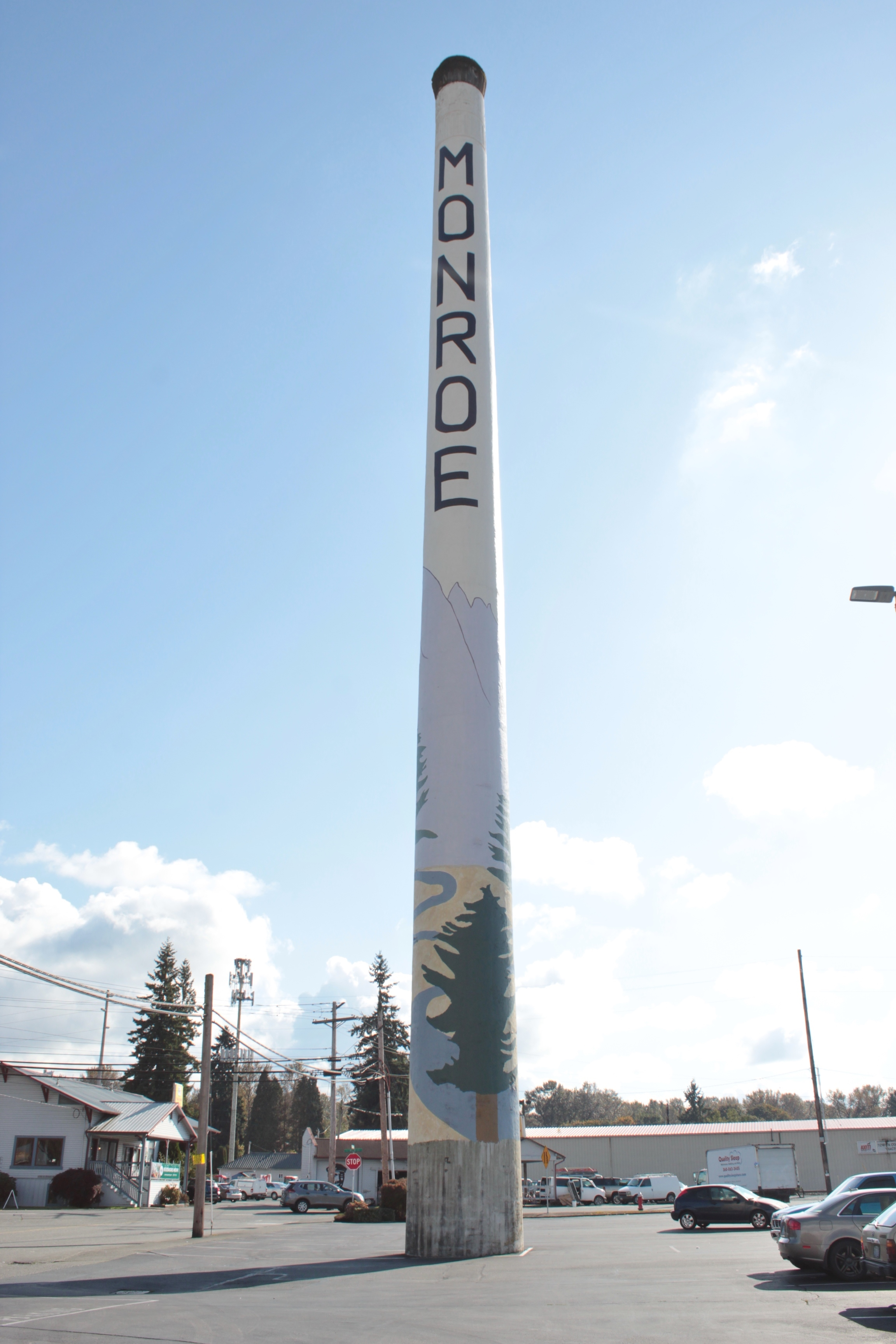
The freestanding Carnation Condensery Stack, constructed for a condensed milk plant that closed in 1928 and burned in a fire in 1944

On the morning of September 16, 1901, a fire started at the Odd Fellows community hall and spread to nearby buildings, destroying the only complete block of businesses in Monroe. The fire caused an estimated $8,100 in damage (equivalent to $250,000 in 2025 dollars), but the businesses and buildings were rebuilt and within two years a permanent fire department was established. Monroe was incorporated as a fourth-class town on December 20, 1902, following an 88–37 vote in favor. At the time of incorporation, the area around Monroe had over 900 residents, five general stores, eight saloons, six restaurants, four sawmills, and five shingle mills. A new town hall building was completed in November 1908, costing $7,000 (equivalent to $177,000 in 2025 dollars) and paid for using a saloon license tax; the building now serves as the home of a local history museum.

The new town government granted a municipal water franchise to a private company in 1903, sparking a conflict with local water companies. A competing water company unsuccessfully sued the town for franchise rights, but later acquired the original franchised company to operate Monroe's water. The town government proposed to acquire the system through a buyout, but their offers were rejected. A separate gravity water system was constructed by the town in 1923 that bankrupted the private system. The town government also granted franchises to private companies for electricity and a hospital in 1903. Monroe gained a new road to Snohomish in 1904, which was followed a year later by a new bridge over the Skykomish River on Lewis Street (now State Route 203).

The state government chose Monroe as the site of the state's second reformatory in 1907, ahead of competing bids from Arlington and Sultan. The first inmate at the facility's temporary buildings in August 1908; construction of a permanent building, now part of the Monroe Correctional Complex, began in May 1910 and was completed later that year at a cost of $1.5 million (equivalent to $37 million in 2025 dollars). The Pacific Coast Condensed Milk Company opened a milk condensery in Monroe on August 29, 1908, serving 2,000 visitors on "Condenser Day". The plant was the largest producer of Carnation brand condensed milk and brought the city's population to 2,500 within two years of opening. Within a year, the plant was producing 250,000 pounds (110,000 kg) of condensed milk per day; the Carnation condensery was later closed in 1928 and destroyed in a fire on March 23, 1944.

By the early 1910s, Monroe and the Cherry Valley were home to seven school districts serving rural communities in the surrounding area. A union high school was proposed to serve the students graduating from the seven districts and was opened on September 1, 1911. A new train depot was constructed by the Great Northern Railway in 1909 to serve the mainline as well as a branch line traversing the Snoqualmie Valley that was opened two years later by the Milwaukee Road. The local timber industry declined and was replaced by a larger reliance on agriculture, namely dairy, vegetable, and berry farms on the logged-off lands around Monroe. One of the largest farms in the area was a 2,000-acre (810 ha) lettuce farm and meat-packing plant owned by Charles Frye, later the benefactor of the Frye Art Museum in Seattle.

=== Civic projects and fairs ===
During the 1920s, several of the larger industrial employers in Monroe expanded their operations and attracted new businesses to the area, including an early radio station. The county government opened a new 100-bed hospital on the poor farm complex in 1925 at a cost of $92,000 (equivalent to $1.34 million in 2025 dollars) to provide services to local residents. By the end of the decade, the town had gained new churches, a new masonic hall, a larger condensery plant, and a movie theater. A greenhouse operated by the Great Northern Railway was established in 1926 to supply passengers and decorate trains with fresh flowers. The complex later expanded to include ten greenhouses, but were demolished in 1962.

At the onset of the Great Depression in 1929, several lettuce farms in the Monroe area had folded and been acquired by the Frye Company, which provided employment through the decade for 1,000 residents. The farm was foreclosed in the late 1930s by a subsidiary of Great Northern after lettuce prices had declined. Service organizations in the town ran charity assistance programs for unemployed residents and their families, raising money from large employers to fund food and clothing donations. The Works Progress Administration (WPA) began civic improvement projects around Monroe in 1933, including repairs to damage caused by a major flood in February 1932. The WPA also funded road improvements and a new middle school with a small auditorium that is now home to the Wagner Performing Arts Center.

The local granges of the Monroe area began organizing agricultural fairs and parades in the 1930s on a semi-regular basis. The county also had its own regular fair that was hosted in Snohomish and Granite Falls until the 1920s. The granges hosted the first Cavalcade of the Valleys in 1941, which was followed by the Snohomish County Fair at the poor farm grounds in 1946. The event was renamed the Evergreen State Fair in 1949 and has been hosted annually in Monroe ever since. The fairgrounds were bisected by U.S. Route 2, the successor to an earlier highway across Stevens Pass, which opened in 1949.

Following the Great Depression and World War II, Monroe's economy became more reliant on agriculture and smaller industries. A frozen food processing facility was located in Monroe until 1958 and was later replaced with a seafood processor. By 1949, the local government had twice rejected proposals to become a third-class city because of the increased operating costs needed; it also lacked a full-time fire department. The Valley General Hospital was established in 1961 to replace the county-run general hospital on the poor farm complex. A major earthquake struck the Puget Sound region on April 29, 1965, causing severe damage to the original Monroe High School and its annex. The high school campus was demolished and replaced by a new building that opened in October 1968 and served the city until the modern campus was built in 1999. Great Northern was consolidated into the Burlington Northern Railroad in 1970, and the Monroe train depot was demolished in October of that year.

Notable people

@Benson Boone

=== Suburban growth ===
State Route 522, a new state highway connecting Monroe to Bothell, was opened to traffic on February 10, 1965. The easier car access made Monroe into a bedroom community for Everett, Seattle, and the Eastside region, with new suburban subdivisions being built around the city and annexed by the end of the decade. A new state prison, the Twin Rivers Corrections Center, was opened in 1984 and brought new jobs to the area despite opposition from residents.

The former Frye lettuce farm in western Monroe was sold in the late 1980s to an Eastside-based real estate developer, which proposed the "Fryelands" residential and industrial neighborhood. The Fryelands industrial park, once proposed for a Boeing 777 parts facility, was developed adjacent to another industrial park that was opened a decade earlier. The residential component of the development sold out in 1993 and began construction that year alongside other subdivisions in western Monroe. As part of mitigation for the Fryelands project, an artificial lake named Lake Tye was created to provide wetlands and a park for residents. Between 1990 and 2000, the population of the city doubled to over 13,000.

The increased residential development in Monroe caused worsened congestion on State Route 522, which was named one of the most dangerous highways in the United States. The state government began a widening and safety improvement program in 1995 that has continued since then, gradually building four-lane sections for the highway and upgrading the remaining two-lane sections. During the 1990s and 2000s, several large strip malls and big-box stores were built along U.S. Route 2 north of downtown. The North Kelsey development in the early 2010s brought a controversial Walmart to Monroe, which was challenged by neighborhood activists for violating the city's plans for a pedestrian-friendly retail neighborhood. Since 2000, the Downtown Revitalization and Enhancement Association of Monroe (DREAM) has sponsored revitalization projects in downtown Monroe to preserve the city's main street. More recent development in Monroe has been concentrated in the northern hills, which were annexed into the city in the 2000s.

== Geography ==
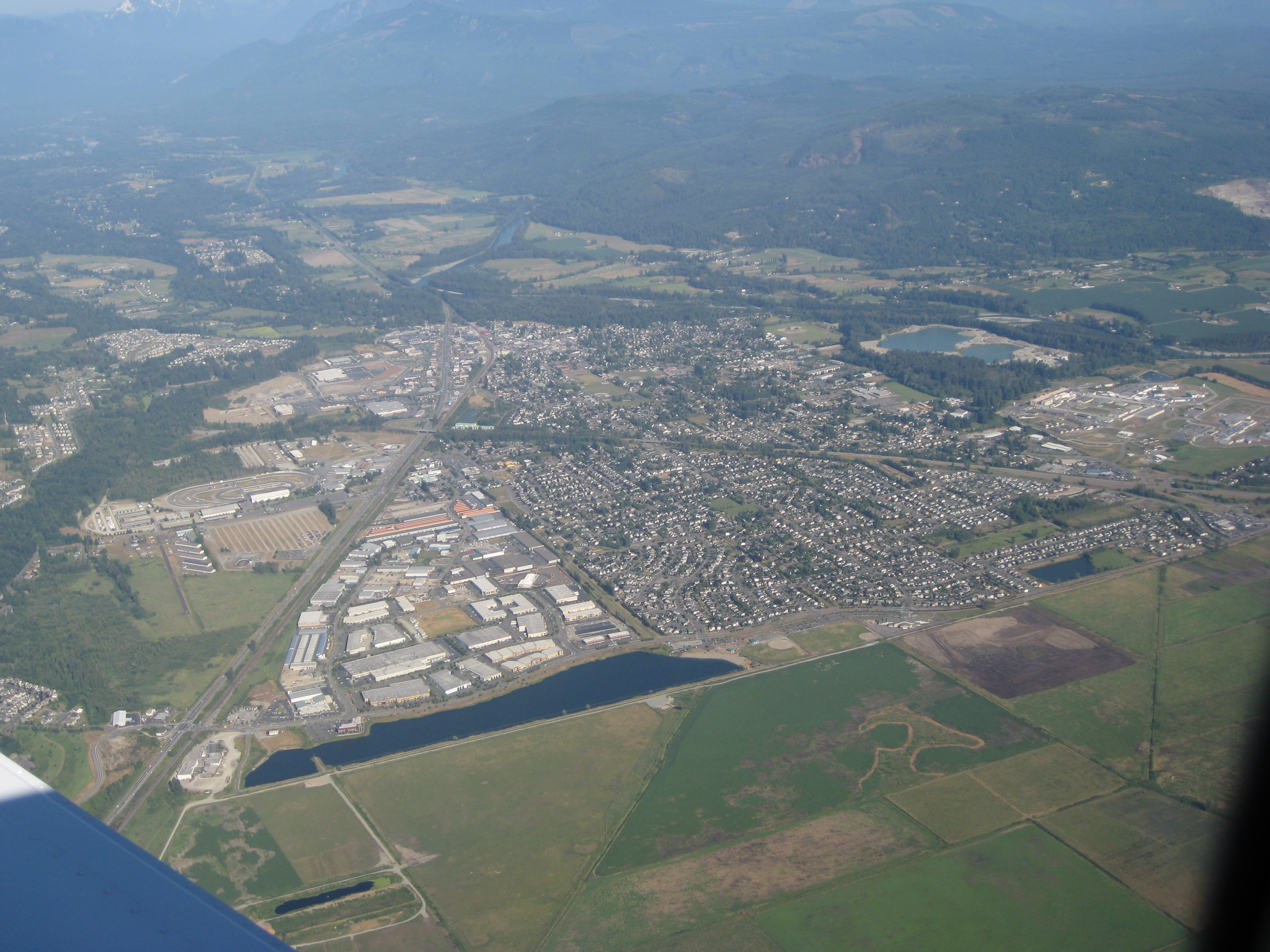
Aerial view of Monroe, looking east from Fryelands and Lake Tye

Monroe is located in south-central Snohomish County near the confluence of the Skykomish and Snoqualmie rivers, which form the Snohomish River. The area is in the western foothills of the Cascade Range and is bisected by U.S. Route 2, a major cross-state highway. According to the United States Census Bureau, the city has a total area of 6.11 square miles (15.82 km^{2}), of which, 6.05 square miles (15.67 km^{2}) is land and 0.06 square miles (0.16 km^{2}) is water. The city limits are generally defined by Lake Tye and Fryelands Boulevard to the west, the Skykomish River to the south, Woods Creek to the east, and to the north by Milwaukee Hill and other foothills. Monroe also has an urban growth area that includes 251 acres (102 ha) of unincorporated areas on the north side of the city limits. The city had annexed 1,367 acres (553 ha) of the urban growth area between 1993 and 2011.

The city lies at the eastern end of the Snohomish River floodplain, with elevations that range from 40 to 210 feet (12 to 64 m). The south and east edges of the city along the Skykomish River are within a 100-year flood hazard zone and also include habitats for migratory birds and game animals. The residential neighborhoods of Monroe lie within the watersheds of French Creek and Woods Creek, which both drain into the Skykomish River before its confluence with the Snoqualmie and Snohomish rivers. The surrounding area includes hills and plateaus that were formed from glacial till and gravel deposits from the Skykomish River. Monroe also sits on a local fault line that produced a pair of minor earthquakes on July 12, 2019, that were felt as far as Seattle and Vancouver without causing damage.

=== Climate ===
Monroe has a general climate similar to most of the Puget Sound lowlands, with dry summers and mild, rainy winters moderated by a marine influence from the Pacific Ocean. The majority of the region's precipitation arrives during the winter and early spring, and Monroe averages 177 days of precipitation per year. Monroe's location in the foothills of the Cascade Range brings additional precipitation compared to nearby communities, with 48 inches (1,200 mm) annually compared to 33 inches (840 mm) in Everett. Monroe rarely receives significant snowfall, with an average of 8 inches (20 cm) per year since 1929.

July is Monroe's warmest month, with average high temperatures of 76.4 °F (24.7 °C), while January is the coolest, at an average high of 44.9 °F (7.2 °C). The highest recorded temperature, 102 °F (39 °C), occurred on July 29, 2009, and the lowest, −3 °F (−19 °C), occurred on January 18, 1950. The highest recorded snowfall, 60.4 inches (153 cm), also occurred in January 1950. According to the Köppen climate classification system, Monroe has a warm-summer Mediterranean climate (Csb).

On March 30, 2017, an EF0 tornado struck Monroe and damaged several recreational vehicles at a dealership, but did not injure any people. Tornadoes are a rare occurrence in Western Washington, but the Puget Sound Convergence Zone is able to provide the necessary conditions to create one.

Climate data for Monroe, WA (1991-2020 normals; extremes 1929-present)
Month	Jan	Feb	Mar	Apr	May	Jun	Jul	Aug	Sep	Oct	Nov	Dec	Year
Record high °F (°C)	72 (22)	75 (24)	79 (26)	88 (31)	94 (34)	100 (38)	102 (39)	101 (38)	97 (36)	88 (31)	77 (25)	66 (19)	102 (39)
Mean daily maximum °F (°C)	45.5 (7.5)	49.1 (9.5)	53.6 (12.0)	58.8 (14.9)	65.5 (18.6)	69.3 (20.7)	75.7 (24.3)	76.2 (24.6)	70.1 (21.2)	59.2 (15.1)	49.7 (9.8)	44.0 (6.7)	58.3 (14.6)
Daily mean °F (°C)	39.5 (4.2)	41.3 (5.2)	45.0 (7.2)	49.5 (9.7)	55.5 (13.1)	59.7 (15.4)	64.6 (18.1)	64.7 (18.2)	59.7 (15.4)	51.0 (10.6)	43.1 (6.2)	38.4 (3.6)	51.0 (10.6)
Mean daily minimum °F (°C)	33.5 (0.8)	33.6 (0.9)	36.5 (2.5)	40.1 (4.5)	45.6 (7.6)	50.1 (10.1)	53.5 (11.9)	53.1 (11.7)	49.1 (9.5)	42.9 (6.1)	36.6 (2.6)	32.9 (0.5)	42.3 (5.7)
Record low °F (°C)	−3 (−19)	−2 (−19)	12 (−11)	23 (−5)	29 (−2)	34 (1)	33 (1)	35 (2)	30 (−1)	21 (−6)	1 (−17)	1 (−17)	−3 (−19)
Average precipitation inches (mm)	6.15 (156)	4.49 (114)	5.22 (133)	4.38 (111)	3.28 (83)	2.53 (64)	1.15 (29)	1.23 (31)	2.76 (70)	5.03 (128)	7.39 (188)	6.88 (175)	50.49 (1,282)
Average snowfall inches (cm)	0.9 (2.3)	1.8 (4.6)	0.2 (0.51)	0.0 (0.0)	0.0 (0.0)	0.0 (0.0)	0.0 (0.0)	0.0 (0.0)	0.0 (0.0)	0.0 (0.0)	0.3 (0.76)	1.4 (3.6)	4.6 (11.77)
Average precipitation days (≥ 0.01 in)	20.4	17.3	20.4	17.3	14.2	12.4	6.4	6.1	11.3	17.8	21.6	21.9	187.1
Average snowy days (≥ 0.1 in)	0.4	0.6	0.2	0.0	0.0	0.0	0.0	0.0	0.0	0.0	0.2	0.6	2
Source: NOAA

== Economy ==
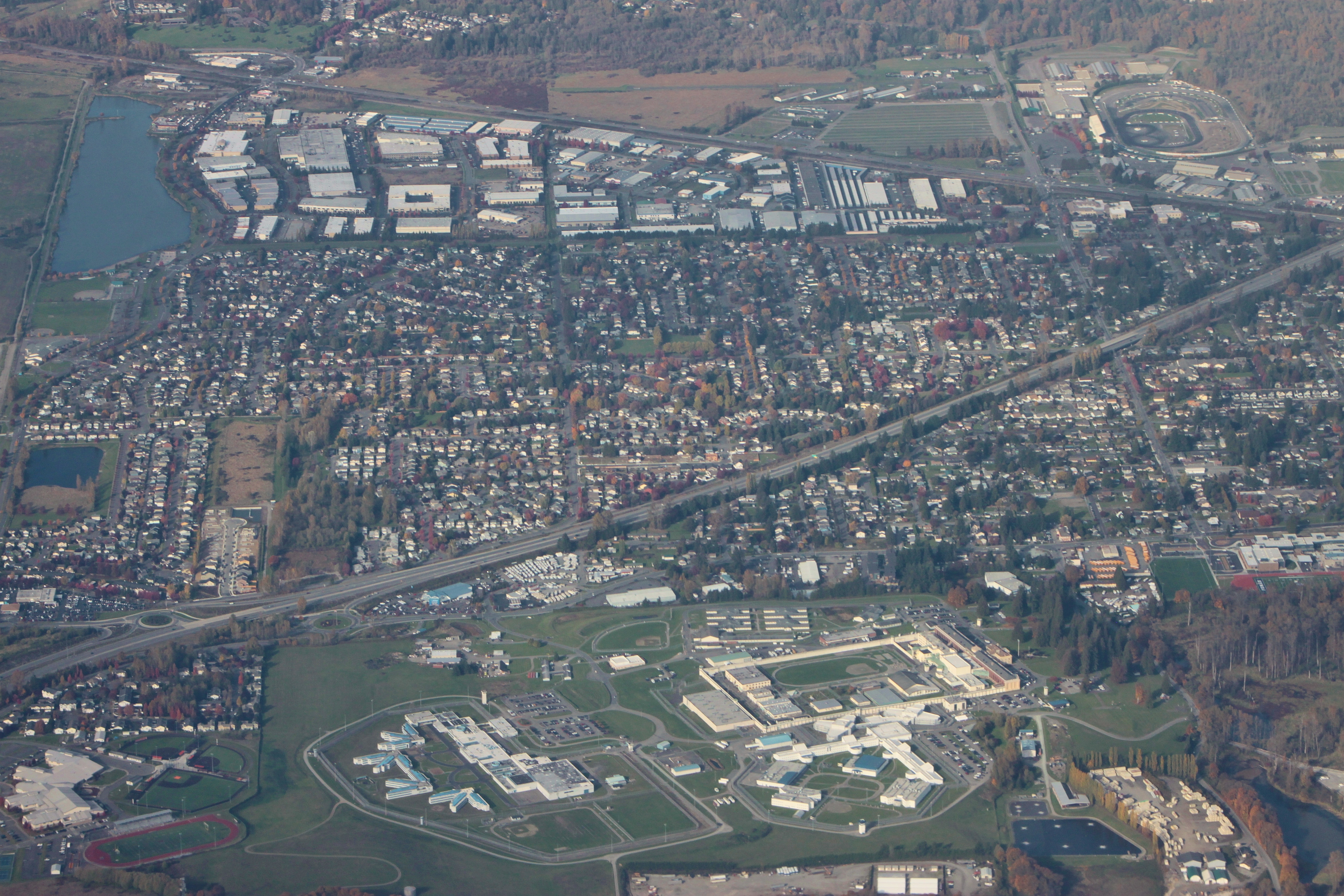
Aerial view of Monroe from the south, including the Monroe Correctional Complex, Evergreen State Fairgrounds, and Fryelands industrial area.

Monroe has an estimated workforce population of 7,644 residents and an unemployment rate of 7.2 percent as of 2015. Only 15 percent of employed residents work within city limits, while the rest commute to other cities for work. The most common locations for jobs employing Monroe residents are in Seattle (15%), Everett (9%), Redmond (9%), Bellevue (8%), and Kirkland (4%). The average one-way commute for the city's workers was approximately 30.8 minutes in 2015; 75 percent of commuters drove alone to their workplace, while 14 percent carpooled and 3 percent used public transit. The most common occupations for Monroe residents are in the education and health care sector (19%), followed by manufacturing (15%), retail (13%), and professional fields (12%).

The city of Monroe has 9,466 jobs, primarily employing residents from within the city and in smaller communities to the east. The city's largest employer is the Washington State Department of Corrections, which operates the Monroe Correctional Complex and provides more than 1,100 jobs. Other large employers include the Monroe School District, the Cadman quarry, the Evergreen State Fair, EvergreenHealth Monroe, and large retailers. The city also has a large industrial park in the Fryelands area that was established in the 1990s and was fully developed by 2008, providing 24 percent of jobs in the city and 2.2 million square feet (200,000 m^{2}) of space. The largest non-industrial job sectors include professional services, government, and retail, particularly big-box stores along the U.S. Route 2 corridor.

== Demographics ==
Historical population
Census	Pop.	Note	%±
1910	1,552		—
1920	1,675		7.9%
1930	1,570		−6.3%
1940	1,590		1.3%
1950	1,556		−2.1%
1960	1,901		22.2%
1970	2,687		41.3%
1980	2,869		6.8%
1990	4,278		49.1%
2000	13,795		222.5%
2010	17,304		25.4%
2020	19,699		13.8%
2024 (est.)	19,927		1.2%
U.S. Decennial Census

Monroe is the tenth largest city in Snohomish County by population, with 19,699 people counted in the 2020 U.S. census. It has a large Hispanic and Latino population that trends higher than the rest of the county. The city's population grew rapidly in the years after it incorporated in 1902, but leveled off under 2,000 until the 1970s. Suburban development following the completion of State Route 522 and expansion of U.S. Route 2 caused large increases in Monroe's population, peaking in the 1990s and early 2000s. The inmate population at the Monroe Correctional Complex has been included in census statistics since 1996. Over 65 percent of homes in Monroe are single-family detached structures, while over 15 percent are multi-family residential units.

=== 2020 census ===
As of the 2020 census, there were 19,699 people and 8,703 households living in Monroe, which had a population density of 3,230.9 inhabitants per square mile (1,247.5/km^{2}). There were 6,228 total housing units, of which 95.9% were occupied and 4.1% were vacant or for occasional use. The racial makeup of the city was 68.4% White, 1.4% Native American and Alaskan Native, 3.5% Black or African American, 4.0% Asian, and 0.2% Native Hawaiian and Pacific Islander. Residents who listed another race were 10.0% of the population and those who identified as more than one race were 12.5% of the population. Hispanic or Latino residents of any race were 19.1% of the population.

Of the 8,703 households in Monroe, 53.3% were married couples living together and 8.6% were cohabitating but unmarried. Households with a male householder with no spouse or partner were 16.2% of the population, while households with a female householder with no spouse or partner were 21.9% of the population. Out of all households, 40.7% had children under the age of 18 living with them and 23.3% had residents who were 65 years of age or older. There were 5,970 occupied housing units in Monroe, of which 67.2% were owner-occupied and 32.8% were occupied by renters. A total of 2,542 people were listed as living in institutionalized group quarters, including the state prison facility in Monroe; they made up 12.9% of the city's population.

The median age in the city was 36.1 years old for all sexes. Of the total population, 25.8% of residents were under the age of 19; 31.5% were between the ages of 20 and 39; 33.0% were between the ages of 40 and 64; and 9.8% were 65 years of age or older. The gender makeup of the city was 56.1% male and 43.9% female.

=== 2010 census ===
As of the 2010 census, there were 17,304 people, 5,024 households, and 3,600 families residing in the city. The population density was 2,860.2 inhabitants per square mile (1,104.3/km^{2}). There were 5,306 housing units at an average density of 877.0 per square mile (338.6/km^{2}). The racial makeup of the city was 78.6% White, 3.5% African American, 1.4% Native American, 2.8% Asian, 0.4% Pacific Islander, 9.6% from other races, and 3.8% from two or more races. Hispanic or Latino of any race were 17.1% of the population.

There were 5,024 households, of which 46.6% had children under the age of 18 living with them, 54.0% were married couples living together, 11.4% had a female householder with no husband present, 6.3% had a male householder with no wife present, and 28.3% were non-families. 21.8% of all households were made up of individuals, and 8.9% had someone living alone who was 65 years of age or older. The average household size was 2.92 and the average family size was 3.41.

The median age in the city was 33.1 years. 26.6% of residents were under the age of 18; 8.9% were between the ages of 18 and 24; 36.1% were from 25 to 44; 21.2% were from 45 to 64; and 7.2% were 65 years of age or older. The gender makeup of the city was 56.3% male and 43.7% female.

== Government and politics ==
Monroe is a non-charter code city with a mayor–council government. The seven-member city council typically meets once a week at the city hall, built in 1977 and located at a civic center campus southwest of downtown. The city councilmembers and mayor serve four-year terms that are staggered and filled in elections held during odd-numbered years. Six of the councilmembers are from districts, while the seventh is elected at-large; prior to 2017, the at-large seat was elected to a two-year term. Former city councilmember Patsy Cudaback was elected mayor in 2025.

The city government has 113 employees and an annual budget of $27.1 million in 2017, overseen by a city administrator appointed by the mayor and confirmed by the city council. The government provides municipal services through its departments, which include community development, economic development, emergency services, a municipal court, parks and recreation, permitting, public works, and utilities. The city has a police department with 32 officers and 10 civilian workers. Other services, including the fire district (based in Monroe) and public library, are contracted out to regional authorities and agencies.

At the federal level, Monroe is part of the 8th congressional district, which encompasses the eastern portions of the Snohomish, King, and Pierce counties as well as the entirety of Chelan and Kittitas counties. It was part of the 1st congressional district until 2022, when the 8th district was extended into Snohomish County. At the state level, the city is part of the 12th legislative district, which also crosses the Cascade Mountains and includes Skykomish, part of Snoqualmie, and all of Chelan County except for Wenatchee. Monroe was previously part of the 39th legislative district until it was moved into the cross-mountain district as part of a redistricting compromise in 2022. The city lies within the Snohomish County Council's 5th district, which includes the Skykomish Valley, Snohomish, and Lake Stevens.

=== Correctional centers ===
The Washington State Department of Corrections operates several prison facilities in the city, which have been consolidated into the Monroe Correctional Complex since 1998. It is the largest prison in the state, with capacity for 2,500 inmates and detainees, and is divided into five units across a 365-acre (148 ha) campus that is staffed by 1,185 workers. The Washington State Reformatory opened in 1908 and expanded with a unit for mentally-ill prisoners in 1981 and the 500-bed Twin Rivers medium-custody facility in 1984. The 467-inmate minimum-security unit opened in 1997 and an intensive management unit was opened in 2007 to house 144 inmates at higher security levels. The state legislature's proposal to close the complex in 2009 due to its high costs was withdrawn and replaced with cuts to capacity at other facilities.

== Culture ==
=== Arts ===
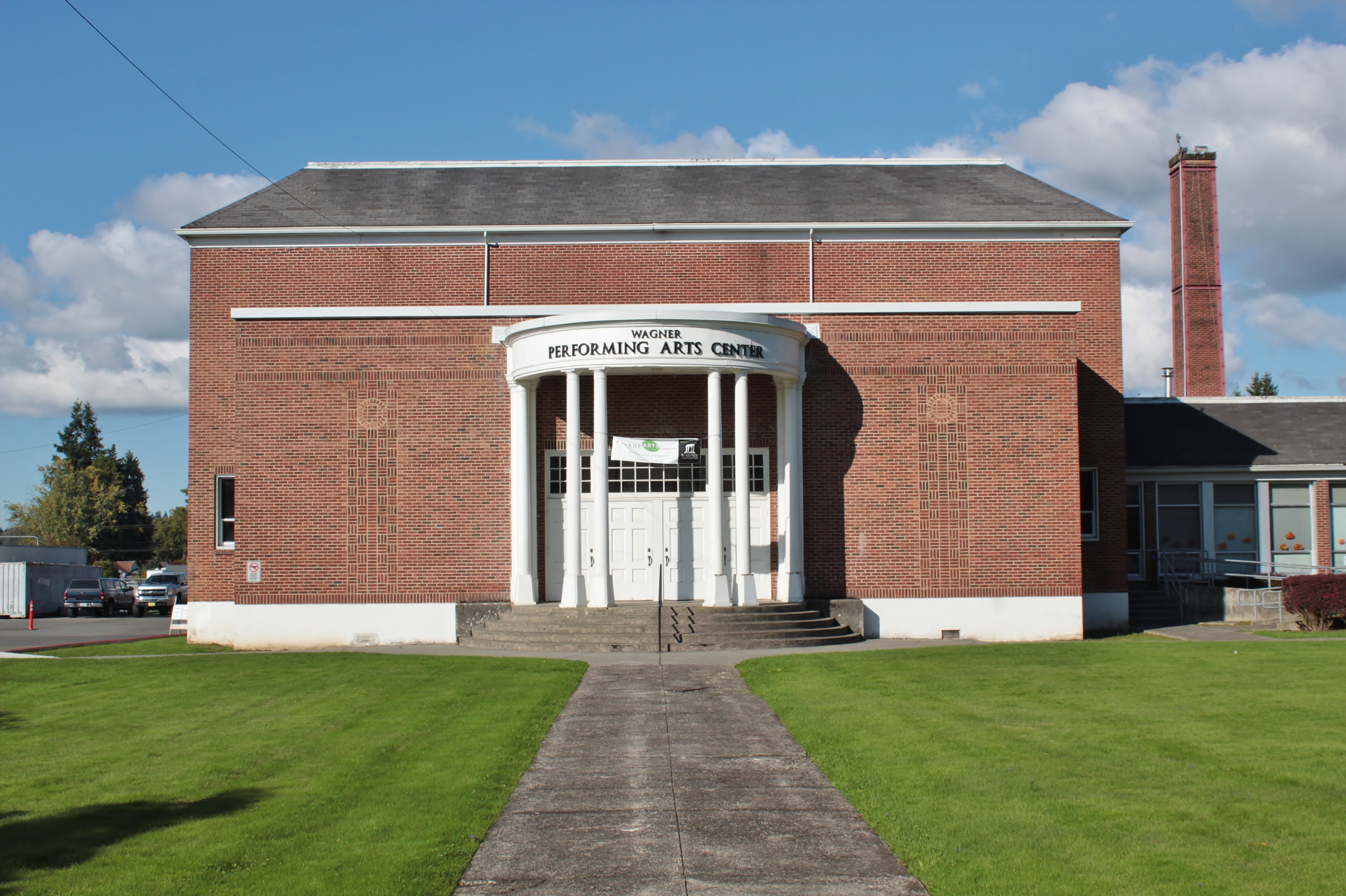
The Wagner Performing Arts Center in downtown Monroe

A non-profit arts council for Monroe was founded in 2003 and sponsors art projects and events in the city using small government grants. The arts council sponsored the creation of an 80-foot (24 m) mural depicting the ecosystem of local rivers that was installed on a building in downtown Monroe in 2004. The arts council renovated an elementary school auditorium into the city's performing arts center in the 2010s after a plan to build a dedicated facility was shelved.

Part of the 1981 drama biographic film Jacqueline Bouvier Kennedy was filmed in Monroe. The Emerald Glen Farm was used for several productions, including the 1984 television series Hot Pursuit and horror films The Ring and The Ring Two. Several scenes in The Butterfly Effect, 7 Minutes, and Korean film Late Autumn were filmed at the Monroe Correctional Complex. The pilot for the web television series The Man in the High Castle features a scene filmed at the Lewis Street Bridge on State Route 203.

=== Attractions and events ===
The city is home to the annual Evergreen State Fair, a county fair which takes place in late August and early September at a fairground located northwest of downtown Monroe. It is the second largest fair in Washington state, behind the Puyallup Fair, and attracts approximately 350,000 over its twelve-day run. The city also has an annual parade during the opening weekend of the fair in late August. The 200-acre (81 ha) fairgrounds are owned by the county government and also host other events year-round. The fairgrounds also include the Evergreen Speedway, a racetrack that hosted the NASCAR Craftsman Truck Series from 1995 to 2000.

The Summer Meltdown music festival relocated from Darrington to a property south of Monroe in 2022 following a two-year pause due to the COVID-19 pandemic. The festival drew approximately 4,000 attendees; it did not return for 2023. The annual Washington Midsummer Renaissance Faire moved from Bonney Lake to Sky Meadows Park near Monroe in 2023.

The Snohomish County Explosion, a semi-professional basketball team playing in the International Basketball League and the National Athletic Basketball League, hosted its games at Monroe Sports Arena on the high school campus from 2008 to 2010 between stints in Everett.

The Reptile Zoo, formerly the Washington Serpentarium, is a roadside animal park for reptiles that is located on U.S. Route 2 east of Monroe. The 3,000-square-foot (280 m^{2}) building houses 150 creatures and attracts 40,000 annual visitors. It was previously located in Gold Bar but moved to the Monroe area in 2003.

=== Parks and recreation ===
Monroe has 14 parks with a total area of 207 acres (84 ha), of which 62.6 acres (25.3 ha) is designated as usable space. The city government's parks and recreation department maintains the parks and organizes recreational events for residents alongside private organizations like the YMCA. Monroe also has 14 miles (23 km) of multi-use pedestrian and bicycle trails that connect neighborhoods and parks. The city's largest park is Al Borlin Park, a 90-acre (36 ha) nature preserve with hiking trails located on the peninsula formed by the Skykomish River and Woods Creek. The city is also located near two county-owned parks: Lord Hill Regional Park, a 1,300-acre (530 ha) nature reserve with wilderness trails; and Fairfield Park, a facility with several soccer fields near the western city limits.

The largest community park in Monroe is the 64.5-acre (26.1 ha) Lake Tye Park, which comprises sports playfields, a skate park, and a 49-acre (20 ha) artificial lake that is stocked with fish. In the 2010s, a private developer proposed construction of a water park on Lake Tye, but the plan remains unfunded. In 2014, the city government proposed constructing a seven-mile (11 km) pedestrian and bicycle trail to Snohomish that would connect with the regional Centennial Trail.

=== Media ===
The area is served by The Everett Herald and The Seattle Times, the daily newspapers in the northern Puget Sound region. The Monroe Monitor and Valley News was a local weekly newspaper published in Monroe by the Pacific Publishing Company. It was founded in 1899 as the Monitor and later acquired two other newspapers operating in the Skykomish Valley: the Monroe Transcript in 1908 and the Valley News in 1985, based in Sultan. The publication ceased and merged with Snohomish County Tribune in November 2021.

Monroe has a public library operated by the Sno-Isle Libraries system, which serves most of Snohomish County. The city's first library opened in 1906 at a private home and later moved to the city hall, where it remained until a dedicated library building was opened in 1966 by Sno-Isle. The library building was expanded by Sno-Isle in 1987 and replaced with the current library building in 2002, located near the civic campus. The new library cost $6.8 million to construct and has 84,000 items in a 20,000 square feet (1,900 m^{2}) building. The Monroe library serves a population of 36,622 residents, including areas surrounding Monroe, and circulated over 291,000 items in 2014.

=== Historical preservation ===
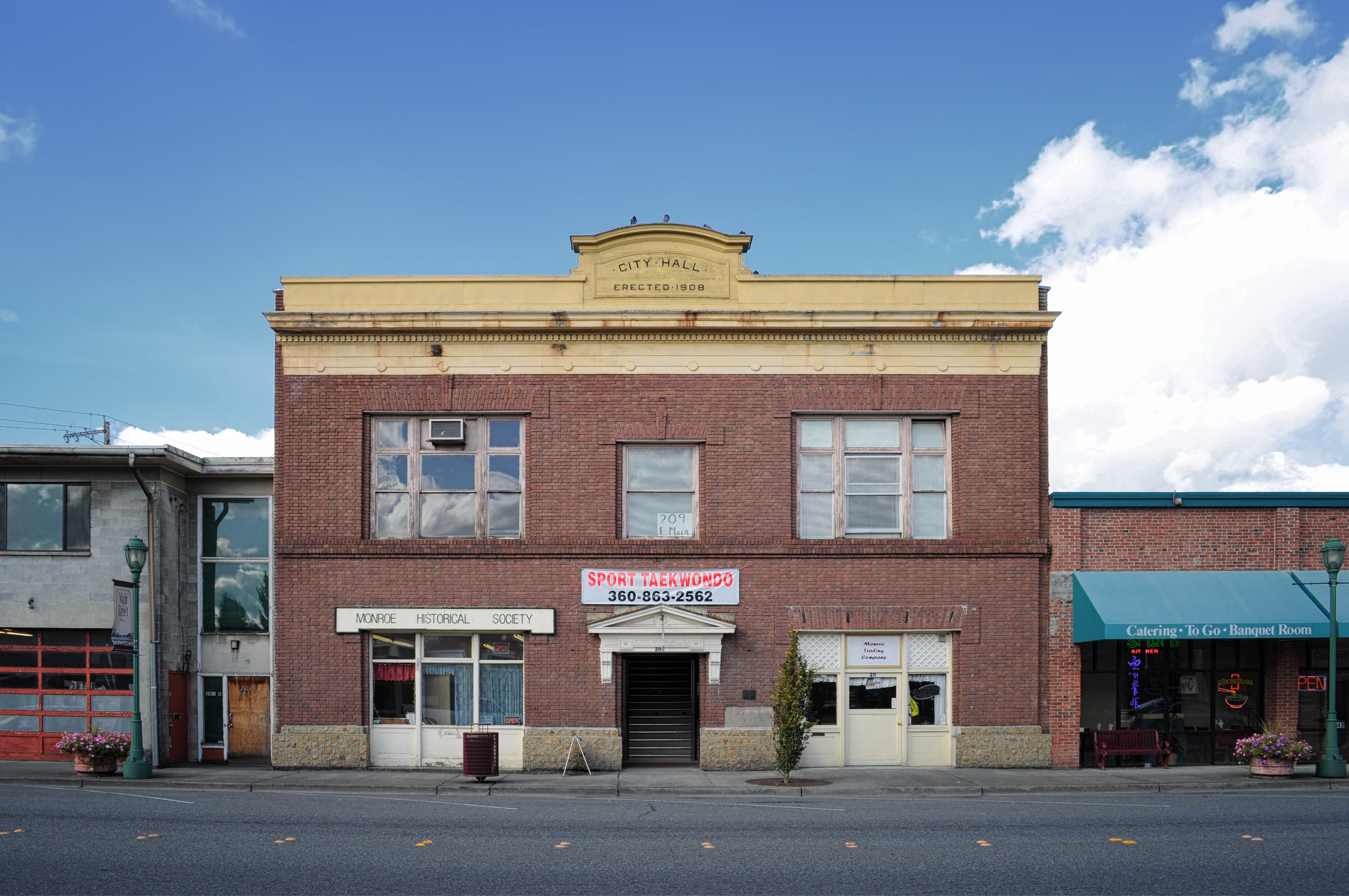
Monroe's former city hall, now used as a historical museum

Monroe's local historical society was established in 1976 and maintains a museum that opened in 1982 at the former city hall in downtown Monroe, built in 1908. The museum has pieces of local memorabilia, including a carved canoe and equipment from closed businesses, and a large collection of historical photographs. The historical society also hosts an exhibit during the Evergreen State Fair at the Shannahan Cabin, a historic home built in the 1880s and moved to the fairgrounds in the 1960s; the cabin is also listed on the county's register of historic places. The fairgrounds are also home to the Western Heritage Center, a county-owned museum that has a collection of agricultural and industrial artifacts that were donated for display.

The downtown area has several historic buildings that were constructed in the early 20th century and preserved by local owners and groups. At the northeast end of downtown is a 150-foot (46 m) landmark steam stack, the last remnant of a Carnation milk condensery plant that was built in 1908 and burned down in 1944.

=== Notable people ===
- Kathryn Aalto, landscape designer and author
- Benson Boone, singer
- Efton Chism, American football player
- Chuck Close, painter and photographer
- Anthony Curcio, American football player, author, and convicted robber
- Ben Dragavon, professional soccer player and coach
- Chad Eaton, American football player
- Blye Pagon Faust, film producer
- Roger Fisher, guitarist
- James Fogle, robber and author
- Little Current, racehorse
- Arthur H. Livermore, science educator and chemist
- Alex Love, flyweight boxer
- Lloyd Meeds, U.S. representative
- Lee Orr, track and field Olympian
- Ian Parmley, professional baseball player
- Kirk Pearson, state representative and senator
- Elizabeth Scott, state representative
- Dave Somers, county executive and former councilmember
- Joseph J. Tyson, Catholic bishop
- Yukon Eric, professional wrestler

== Education ==
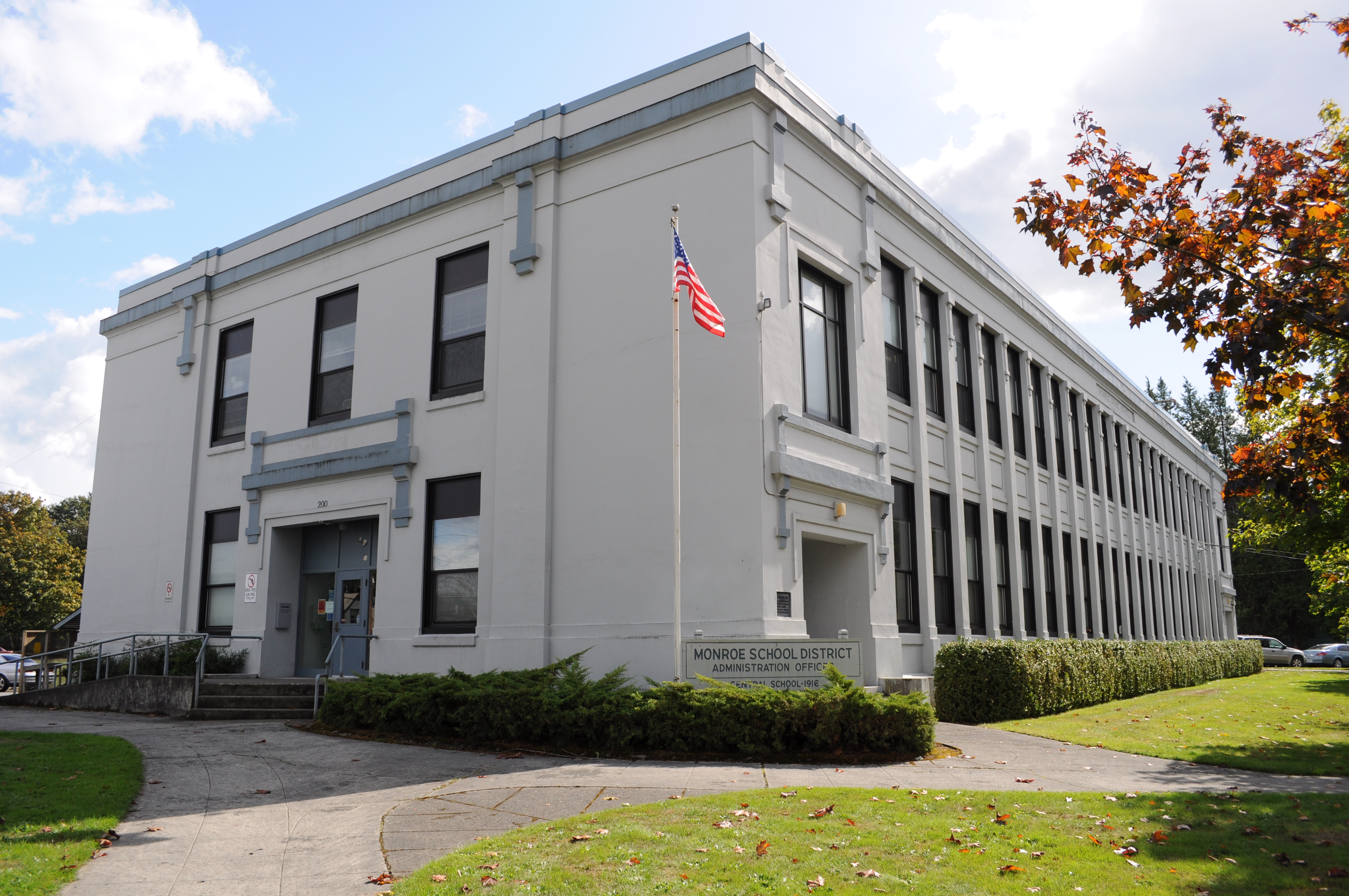
The administration building for the Monroe School District, located in a former downtown elementary school

The Monroe School District operates public schools within the city and serves several surrounding communities, including Maltby and Woods Creek. The school district had an enrollment of approximately 7,096 students in 2016, with 303 total teachers and 170 other staff. It has one high school, Monroe High School, that is located next to the Washington State Reformatory and was opened in 1999 after six failed ballot measures to fund the $30 million construction cost.

The district has one middle school and three elementary schools within Monroe city limits, several of which were renovated in 2018 using $111 million in bonds. Its administrative offices are located in the former Central Grade School building, which opened in 1916.

Several alternative education facilities are also run by the school district for multiple grade levels, including the Sky Valley Educational Center in the former Monroe Middle School building, which was closed after the consolidation of the three middle schools into two buildings. The Sky Valley Educational Center was the subject of several lawsuits filed by 200 students, parents, and teachers against Monsanto over exposure to toxic chemicals, including polychlorinated biphenyls, at the building. The lawsuit was settled with $247 million from Monsanto awarded by a jury and $34 million offered by the school district, who were found to be negligent in their slow cleanup of toxic materials.

Monroe is also home to the East Campus of Everett Community College with 400 enrolled students. The branch campus opened in 1999 as part of an agreement with the Monroe School District and relocated to a new building near Lake Tye in 2010.

== Infrastructure ==
=== Transportation ===
Monroe is located at the intersection of three highways: U.S. Route 2 (US 2), which travels eastward from Everett and over Stevens Pass to Eastern Washington; State Route 203, which follows the Snoqualmie River south towards Fall City and North Bend; State Route 522, an expressway which terminates in Monroe and connects the area to Seattle and Bothell to the southwest. Other major roads in Monroe include Main Street, which continues beyond the city limits towards Snohomish and Sultan; North Kelsey Street, which continues north to Chain Lake; and Fryelands Boulevard on the west edge of the city. US 2 through Monroe has routine traffic congestion issues that have resulted in plans for a highway bypass since the 1970s, but it remains unfunded.

The city is bisected by the Scenic Subdivision, a major railroad owned by BNSF Railway that is used for freight and Amtrak's Empire Builder passenger service. Public transit in Monroe is provided by the countywide Community Transit system, with two local bus routes traveling along the US 2 corridor between Everett and Gold Bar. A commuter bus route from Snohomish to Downtown Bellevue runs during peak periods on State Route 522 and Interstate 405, stopping at a park and ride lot in Monroe with 102 stalls. The route originally served Downtown Seattle but was truncated in 2026 to connect with the 2 Line of the Link light rail system. Snoqualmie Valley Transportation operates a daily shuttle service between Monroe and Duvall on weekdays.

Monroe also has a privately owned airfield, First Air Field, located adjacent to the Evergreen State Fairgrounds. The single-runway facility handles an average of 50 takeoffs and landings per day and has 73 aircraft based there.

=== Utilities ===
The city's public utilities are provided by the municipal government, regional agencies, and private companies. Electrical services in Monroe are provided by the Snohomish County Public Utility District (PUD), a consumer-owned public utility that serves all of Snohomish County. The Snohomish County PUD delivers electricity to Monroe via a transmission corridor from their Snohomish substation to two substations in the city. Puget Sound Energy provides natural gas service to the city's residents and businesses using a pipeline from Canada. Telecommunications services, including telephones, cable television, and internet, are split between Verizon and Comcast. The city government has a waste disposal contract with Waste Management, which provides curbside garbage, recycling, and yard waste collection.

The city government manages tap water and sewage services, which includes treatment and delivery. Monroe's tap water is purchased from the City of Everett and sourced from Lake Chaplain in the Sultan River basin, which travels via a pipeline to the north of the city. Sewage and wastewater is collected and cleaned at a sewage treatment plant that discharges into the Skykomish River. The largest customer for the city's water services is the Washington State Department of Corrections, which also has its own sewage treatment system.

=== Health care ===
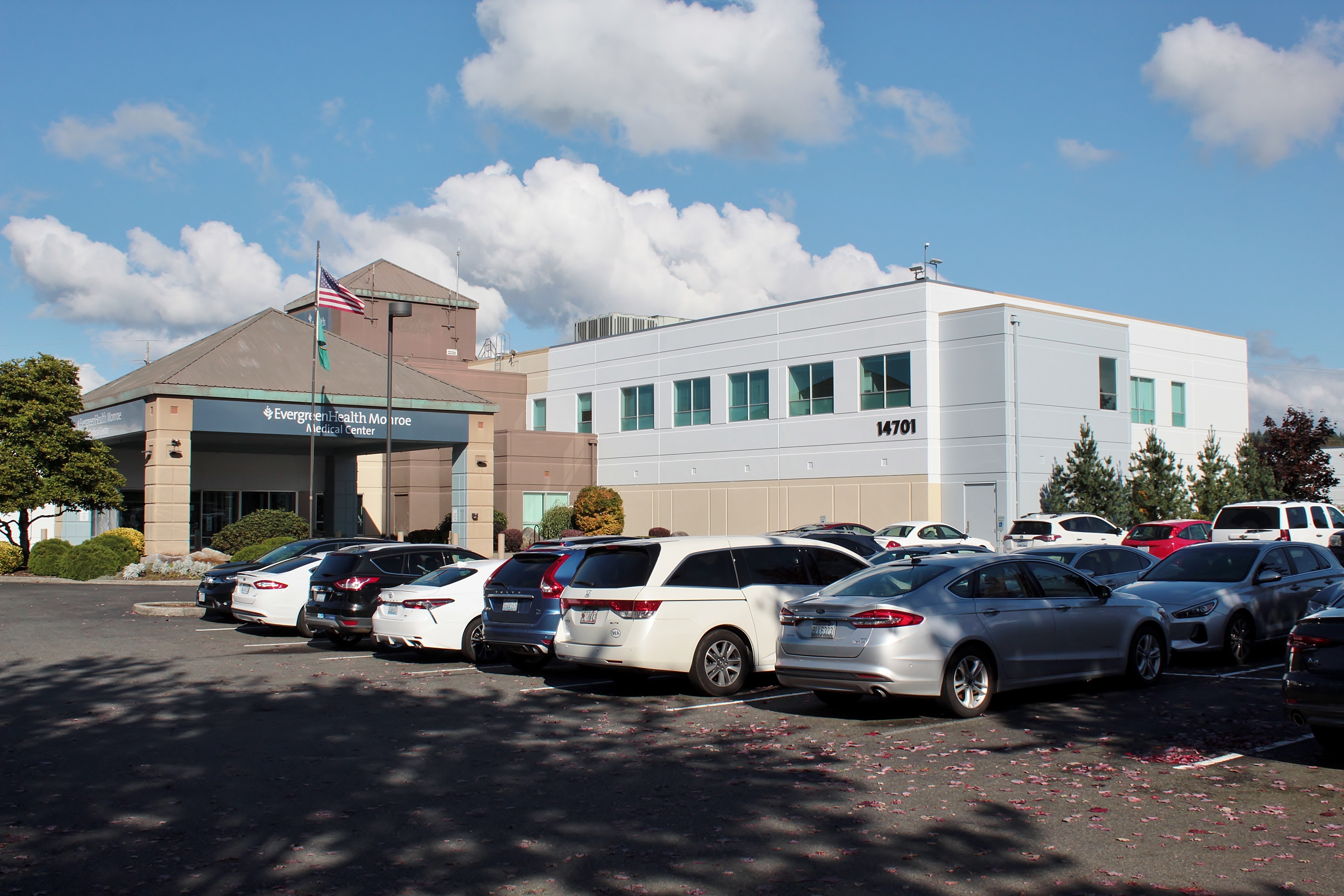
The EvergreenHealth Monroe Medical Center

Monroe has a 112-bed general hospital operated by EvergreenHealth and formerly known as the Valley General Hospital. It was opened in 1949, replacing a facility at the State Poor Farm, and was expanded several times with funds from voter-approved tax levies. It was merged into the EvergreenHealth system, based out of Kirkland, in 2014 and renamed to EvergreenHealth Monroe Medical Center the following year. The city also has several small medical clinics, including those operated by Providence Health & Services and SeaMar Community Health Centers.
