= EvergreenHealth =

Regional health care system in Washington, U.S.

- EvergreenHealth Kirkland
- Predecessor: Evergreen Health Medical Group
- Formation: 1972
- Type: Public hospital district
- Location(s): Kirkland, Washington, U.S. Monroe, Washington, U.S.
- CEO: Ettore Palazzo
- Revenue: $1.9 billion (2018)
- Expenses: $702.8 million (2018)
- Staff: 4,500 employees
- Website: evergreenhealth.com

EvergreenHealth is an American regional healthcare system based in the Seattle metropolitan area of Washington state. It has two general hospitals in Kirkland and Monroe, and several smaller clinics and urgent care facilities in King and Snohomish counties.

The system was formed in 1967 and opened its first hospital, originally named the Evergreen General Hospital, in 1972. It was renamed to Evergreen Healthcare Medical Group in 1996 and shortened to EvergreenHealth in 2012. A second hospital in Monroe was added in 2014 through a merger with the existing Valley General Hospital, which opened in 1949.

== History ==
=== Planning and construction ===
A public hospital district was formed by a voter-approved ballot measure in 1967 to serve northeastern King County, which had experienced population growth that caused strain on existing medical facilities. After the expansion of the existing Kirkland hospital was found to be impractical due to costs, a site near Totem Lake in northeastern Kirkland was chosen for a new multi-story hospital building. A public contest was held to name the new building, with Evergreen General Hospital announced as the winner in August 1968, defeating 280 other names. In November 1968, voters within the district approved a $4.5 million bond measure to finance construction of the 82-bed hospital.

Construction of Evergreen General Hospital began on July 18, 1970, and it was opened to the public on March 9, 1972. The hospital opened with 80 beds, an intensive care unit, two surgery rooms, and specialized departments. The building was designed for future expansion of up to seven floors and 375 beds, as well as auxiliary facilities on the 35-acre (14 ha) campus. The older, privately run Kirkland Hospital had closed in March 1971 after a decline in the number of patients who instead went to the Overlake Hospital in nearby Bellevue.

=== Expansions ===
Following regular overcrowding at the facility in the 1970s, a major expansion to Evergreen General Hospital was constructed in the 1980s. The first expansion added a third floor in 1982 and a fourth in 1984. The hospital also upgraded its trauma center to Level II requirements set by the American College of Surgeons to handle cases previously sent to Overlake, which was competing closely with Evergreen, or Harborview Medical Center in Seattle. A new north wing was opened in 1986, costing $10.2 million to construct, and added a drive-in emergency care center, a larger trauma center, a cafeteria, and an auditorium. The hospital was renamed to Evergreen Hospital Medical Center after the completion of the new wing.

A 15-bed hospice opened on the Evergreen campus in February 1991, funded by a $4.4 million bond measure approved by voters in September 1988 that came months after a hospital expansion was rejected. The 1988 hospital expansion's opposition campaign was partially funded by Overlake Hospital's private foundation on the basis of taxpayer obligation. Evergreen instead used reserve funds and bonds to finance a $30 million east wing expansion, consisting of a 36-room maternity center, four surgical suites, outpatient service centers, a parking garage, and administrative offices in a five-story building that opened in November 1992. The east wing housed the first magnetic resonance imaging (MRI) machine on the West Coast, which was installed in January 1993.

Evergreen joined a regional healthcare alliance led by Swedish Medical Center in 1993 and changed its name to Evergreen Community Health Care two years later. The hospital was certified as the first "Baby-Friendly Hospital" in the United States by UNICEF in 1996 and was recognized for prioritizing breast-feeding for newborns. The organization was renamed in 1996 to Evergreen Healthcare Medical Group and began opening primary care facilities around the Eastside in the 2000s.

The Kirkland hospital expanded further in 2002 with a five-story, 78-bed Surgery and Physicians Center and filed plans for a new tower on the campus. A $120 million bond measure was approved by voters in May 2004 to construct a ten-story tower for overnight stays and surgical facilities. The new tower opened in May 2007 and expanded the emergency department to 42 beds. The system's name was shortened to EvergreenHealth in 2012. EvergreenHealth entered into a partnership with Valley General Hospital in Monroe in 2014, renaming it EvergreenHealth Monroe the following year.

=== COVID-19 pandemic ===
The first eight identified U.S. fatalities from the 2020 pandemic of SARS-CoV-2 were reported at EvergreenHealth Kirkland, beginning with the first on February 29, 2020. The cases were residents or visitors to the Life Care Center of Kirkland, a local nursing home. The hospital increased its number of beds in negative-airflow rooms from 15 to 58 as part of its response to the growing number of coronavirus patients; by March 11, 65 people treated at the hospital had tested positive for SARS-CoV-2 and 15 had died of COVID-19. EvergreenHealth was criticized by its Kirkland employees for not communicating the level of risk posed to them and informing them of infection exposure. By late March, the number of reported cases at the hospital had slowed to less than four per day and the intensive care unit was half-full.

The hospital system received $43 million in CARES Act grants from the federal government in 2020 and 2021, which were used to offset unexpected costs during the COVID-19 pandemic. The grants were counted as part of annual revenue, which triggered bonuses for managers and administrators despite reported operating losses.

== Facilities ==
=== Kirkland ===
EvergreenHealth Kirkland is a 318-bed general hospital in Kirkland, Washington, located near Interstate 405 and The Village at Totem Lake. It opened in 1972 and is the flagship of the EvergreenHealth system, with several specialty buildings on the same campus. The main building is eight stories tall and divided into several zones that each house separate departments. The Kirkland campus includes connections to Interstate 405 and local transit operated by King County Metro, serving a transit center that opened in 2008.

=== Monroe ===
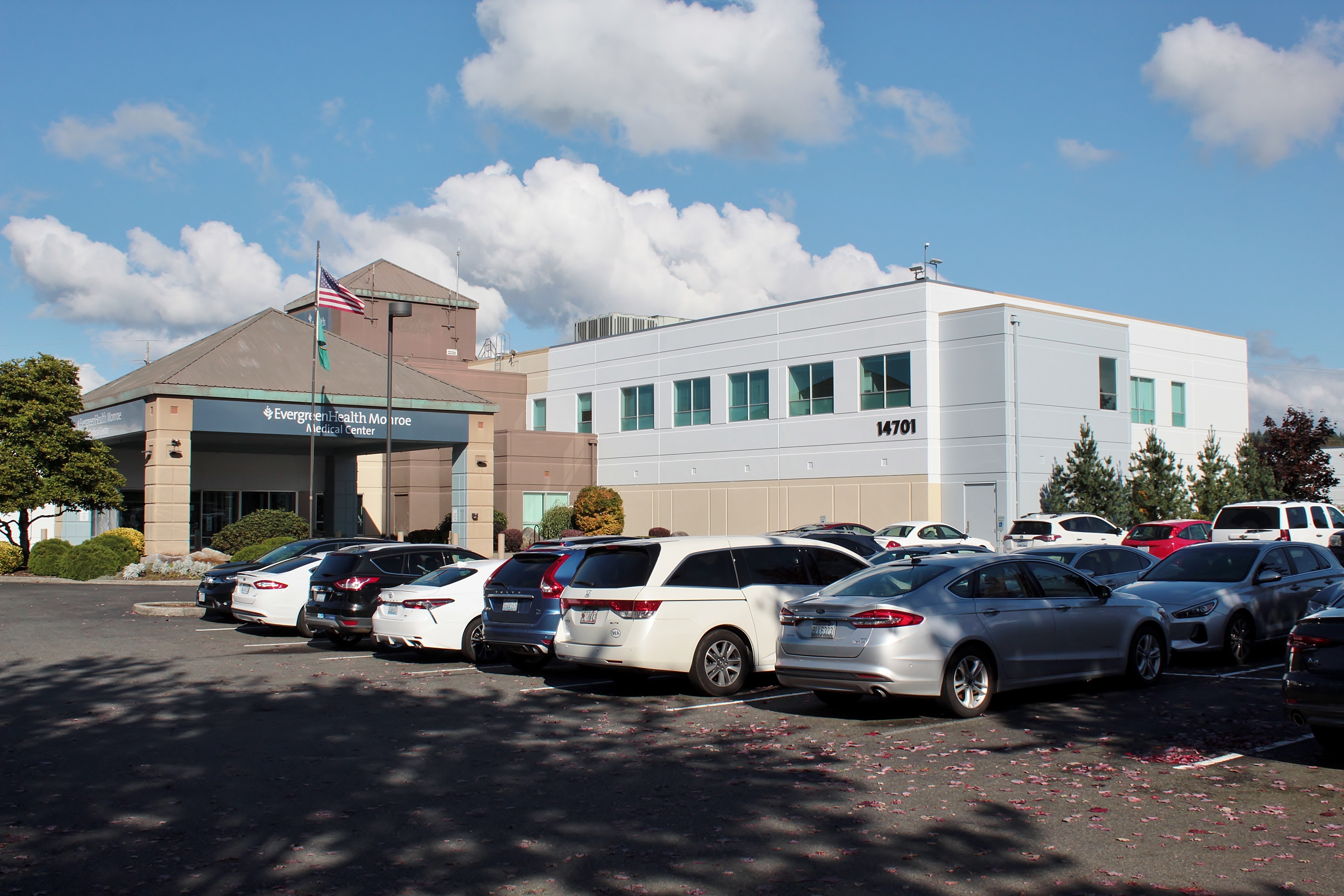
Front entrance of EvergreenHealth Monroe Medical Center

EvergreenHealth Monroe is a 112-bed general hospital in Monroe, Washington, a suburban city in eastern Snohomish County. It was founded in 1949 as the Valley General Hospital and was operated by a public hospital district from 1960 to 2014. The hospital also had a separate clinic operated by Group Health from 1996 to 2003.

=== Clinics ===
EvergreenHealth operates primary care centers and clinics in Canyon Park, Duvall, Kenmore, Kirkland, Mill Creek, Monroe, Redmond, Sammamish, Sultan, and Woodinville.

== Organization ==
EvergreenHealth has 4,500 employees, including 1,100 physicians and 500 volunteers. It is officially the King County Public Hospital District No. 2 and managed by an elected board of commissioners from within the hospital district, which encompasses most of the northern Eastside. The board of commissioners was increased from five seats to seven in 2016. The Monroe facility is managed by an Alliance Governance Board with representatives from EvergreenHealth and the Snohomish County Public Hospital District No. 1, which has five elected commissioners.

In 2018, EvergreenHealth had total revenue of $1.9 billion, primarily from Medicare and private insurers, and total expenses of $702.8 million. The King County facilities served 340,146 outpatient visits, while the Snohomish County facilities served 16,257 visits. EvergreenHealth is part of Eastside Health Alliance, which also includes Overlake Hospital Medical Center, and has partnerships with the Seattle Cancer Care Alliance.

== See also ==
- List of hospitals in Washington (state)
