= Evergreen State Fair =

Annual state fair in Monroe, Washington, U.S.

Coordinates: 47°51′59″N 121°59′20″W

- The 2026 Evergreen State Fair
- Genre: State fair
- Date: Late August – Early September
- Frequency: Annually
- Locations: Monroe, Washington, U.S.
- Website: www.evergreenfair.org

The Evergreen State Fair is a 12-day fair which is held each year from late August through Labor Day. It is the largest county fair in the Pacific Northwest region of the United States and the largest single attraction held annually in Snohomish County. Situated in Monroe, Washington, 35 miles northeast of Seattle and 12 miles east of Everett, the fairgrounds cover 193 acres with buildings and land valued at more than $50 million. The facilities are available for rent during the year, making the grounds a valuable community resource. A staff of 21 works year-round at the site and over 400 fair-time employees are hired each August.

The Evergreen State Fairgrounds feature permanent facilities that are used year-round for Northwest horse shows, trade shows, swap meets, auto races and more. They are also home to the Gary Weikel Events Center (a 4,000 square foot multi-purpose building) and the Evergreen Speedway, the only NASCAR venue in Washington with a 7,000-seat covered grandstand. In addition the site hosts a clear-span sports arena that can seat 4,000, two RV areas with dump stations, and a variety of other permanent exhibition facilities.

== History ==
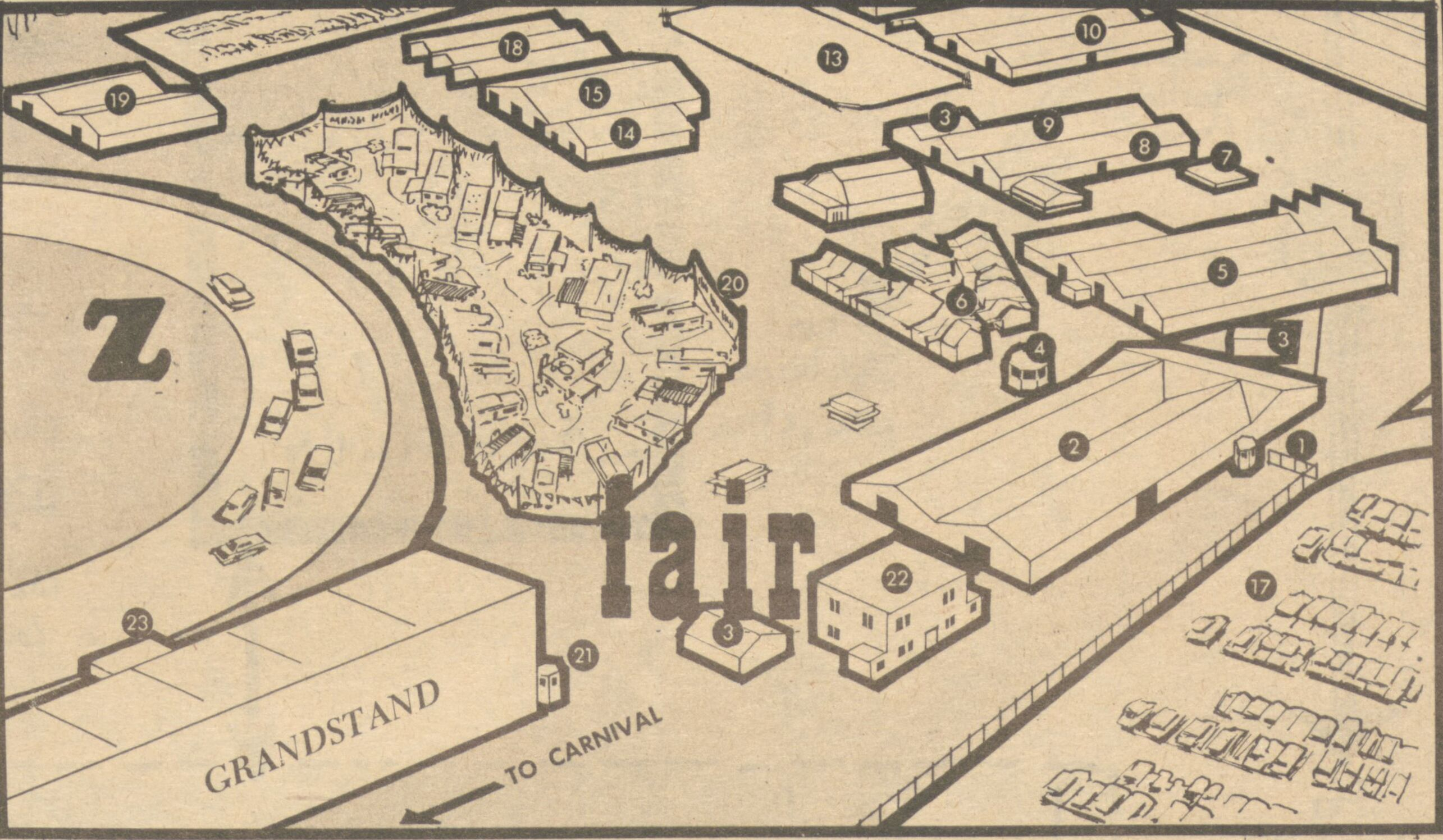
Fairgrounds map, 1968

The first agricultural show in Snohomish County was held in November 1874 by local farmers and tradesmen at the Blue Eagle Building in Snohomish. The Snohomish County Agricultural Society organized annual editions of the fair until 1878, sending exhibits to represent the county at a territorial fair in Olympia, but was unable to continue the event because of the ongoing national financial panic. Other fairs were held in Everett, the new county seat, Monroe, and Snohomish at various sites. The Snohomish County Fairgrounds was established in 1911 at a 8-acre (3.2 ha) site on the west side of the city, but was only used by the county fair until 1916.

The Snohomish County Fair moved to Granite Falls in 1922 and was later replaced by community fairs, named the Cavalcade of Valleys, in areas around Monroe during the Great Depression and World War II. The county fair was moved permanently to Monroe, opening at the modern-day fairgrounds on September 5, 1946, and renaming itself to the Evergreen State Fair in 1949. A 4,000-seat sports arena was completed in 1970, coinciding with a longer ten-day run for the fair.

The fair has only been cancelled three times: during the 1918 Spanish flu pandemic (lasting until 1921), World War II, and the 2020 COVID-19 pandemic.

As of 2023, the Evergreen State Fair runs for 12 days in late August and early September with a break day. Approximately 45 percent of waste is recycled or composted as part of a county program.

== Fairgrounds ==
The Evergreen State Fairgrounds encompasses 193 acres (78 ha) in northwestern Monroe that hosts the fair and other annual events. During local natural disasters, such as floods and wildfires, the fairgrounds have served as an emergency shelter for people and livestock.

== See also ==
- Washington State Fair
