= Monroe North, Washington =

- CDP
- Location within Washington (state)
- Coordinates: 47°52′57″N 121°59′17″W
- Country: United States
- State: Washington
- County: Snohomish

Area
  - Total: 2.44 sq mi (6.3 km^{2})
  - Land: 2.44 sq mi (6.3 km^{2})
  - Water: 0.00 sq mi (0 km^{2})
- Elevation: 246 ft (75 m)

Population (2020)
  - Total: 1,796
  - Density: 736/sq mi (284/km^{2})
- Time zone: Pacific
- Area code: 360

Monroe North is a census-designated place (CDP) in Snohomish County, Washington, United States. The population was 1,796 at the 2020 census. The CDP comprises an area north of the city of Monroe that includes the Evergreen State Fairgrounds.

== Geography ==
Monroe North is located at 47°52′57″N 121°59′17″W (47.882534, -121.987952).

According to the United States Census Bureau, the CDP has a total area of 2.44 square miles (6.3 km^{2}), all of it land.

== Demographics ==
Historical population
Census	Pop.	Note	%±
2010	1,666		—
2020	1,796		7.8%
U.S. Decennial Census; 2000 2010

Monrie North first appeared as a census designated place in the 2010 U.S. census formed from area detached from Monroe city and additional area.

=== Racial and ethnic composition ===
Monroe North CDP, Washington – Racial and ethnic composition Note: the US Census treats Hispanic/Latino as an ethnic category. This table excludes Latinos from the racial categories and assigns them to a separate category. Hispanics/Latinos may be of any race.
Race / Ethnicity (NH = Non-Hispanic)	Pop 2010	Pop 2020	% 2010	% 2020
White alone (NH)	1,470	1,497	88.24%	83.35%
Black or African American alone (NH)	4	15	0.24%	0.84%
Native American or Alaska Native alone (NH)	8	8	0.48%	0.45%
Asian alone (NH)	20	18	1.20%	1.00%
Native Hawaiian or Pacific Islander alone (NH)	1	1	0.06%	0.06%
Other race alone (NH)	3	17	0.18%	0.95%
Mixed race or Multiracial (NH)	45	101	2.70%	5.62%
Hispanic or Latino (any race)	115	139	6.90%	7.74%
Total	1,666	1,796	100.00%	100.00%

=== 2020 census ===
As of the 2020 census, Monroe North had a population of 1,796. The median age was 40.3 years. 23.5% of residents were under the age of 18 and 13.9% of residents were 65 years of age or older. For every 100 females there were 103.9 males, and for every 100 females age 18 and over there were 109.5 males age 18 and over.

95.7% of residents lived in urban areas, while 4.3% lived in rural areas.

There were 618 households in Monroe North, of which 34.3% had children under the age of 18 living in them. Of all households, 72.3% were married-couple households, 11.2% were households with a male householder and no spouse or partner present, and 13.1% were households with a female householder and no spouse or partner present. About 12.3% of all households were made up of individuals and 5.7% had someone living alone who was 65 years of age or older.

There were 629 housing units, of which 1.7% were vacant. The homeowner vacancy rate was 0.5% and the rental vacancy rate was 0.0%.

Racial composition as of the 2020 census
Race	Number	Percent
White	1,536	85.5%
Black or African American	18	1.0%
American Indian and Alaska Native	10	0.6%
Asian	20	1.1%
Native Hawaiian and Other Pacific Islander	1	0.1%
Some other race	61	3.4%
Two or more races	150	8.4%
