= Arthur H. Livermore =

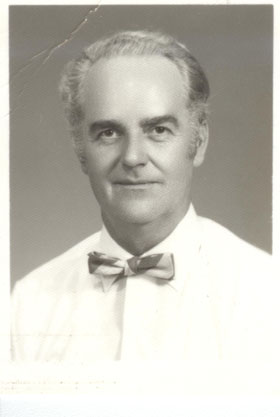
- Arthur Livermore 1961
- Born: August 14, 1915; Monroe, Washington, United States
- Died: October 12, 2009 (aged 94); Gloucester, Massachusetts, United States
- Education: B.A. Reed College 1940; Ph.D. University of Rochester 1944
- Scientific career
- Workplaces: American Association for the Advancement of Science

Arthur Hamilton Livermore (August 14, 1915 – October 12, 2009) was a science educator. He was educated at Reed College in Portland and in the University of Rochester in New York, where he worked on the synthesis of penicillin under Vincent du Vigneaud, who won the 1955 Nobel Prize in chemistry. He obtained a PhD in Chemistry in 1944. He taught biochemistry at Cornell University and Reed College to 1963. He was awarded a Guggenheim Fellowship in 1954 for work in Molecular & Cellular Biology.

He worked for the American Association for the Advancement of Science (AAAS) in Washington, D.C. from 1963 to 1981. For 18 months, he worked in Penang, Malaysia, training educators from Asian countries. In the 1970s, he directed a program for a university science lecturers' exchange between the U.S. and the Soviet Union. He was a member of the Cosmos Club.

After retirement, he continued as a science adviser, teacher and volunteer in Washington.
