= Ian Parmley =

American baseball player (born 1989)

- Outfielder
- Born: December 19, 1989 (age 35); Snohomish, Washington, U.S.
- Batted: Left Threw: Left

MLB debut
- June 23, 2017, for the Toronto Blue Jays

Last MLB appearance
- June 25, 2017, for the Toronto Blue Jays

MLB statistics
- Batting average: .000
- Home runs: 0
- Runs batted in: 0
- Stats at Baseball Reference

Teams
- Toronto Blue Jays (2017)

Ian Gene Parmley (born December 19, 1989) is an American former professional baseball outfielder. He played in Major League Baseball (MLB) for the Toronto Blue Jays.

== High school and college ==
Parmley attended Monroe High School in Monroe, Washington. Undrafted out of high school, he then played two seasons of baseball for Bellevue College before transferring to Liberty University in Lynchburg, Virginia.

== Professional career ==
=== Minor leagues ===
Parmley was selected in the seventh round of the 2012 Major League Baseball draft by the Toronto Blue Jays, and was assigned to the Low–A Vancouver Canadians. In 58 games, he recorded a .201 batting average, 12 runs batted in (RBI), and 12 stolen bases. He remained with Vancouver for the 2013 campaign and was named a mid-season All-Star, hitting .257 with 15 RBI and 23 steals in 66 games. Parmley split the 2014 season with the Single–A Lansing Lugnuts and High–A Dunedin Blue Jays. In 56 total games played, he batted .224 with 10 RBI and 14 stolen bases.

Parmley made his Double–A debut in 2015, splitting time with Dunedin and the New Hampshire Fisher Cats. He played in 78 games, and hit .228 with one home run, 22 RBI, and 6 steals. Parmley spent the entire 2016 season with New Hampshire, and established several career-highs. In 92 games, he batted .294 with two home runs, 26 RBI, and 13 stolen bases. Parmley began the 2017 season with the Triple–A Buffalo Bisons. At the time of his first call up to the Majors, Parmley was batting .289 with one home run and 20 RBI.

=== Major leagues ===
On June 23, 2017, Parmley was promoted to the major leagues for the first time, making his major league debut on that same day. He was designated for assignment on July 1. Parmley returned to Triple-A Buffalo shortly afterward and played the remainder of the season there. On June 25, 2018, he was released by the Blue Jays.
