= High Bridge, Washington =

- CDP
- Location of High Bridge, Washington
- Coordinates: 47°47′57″N 122°1′26″W
- Country: United States
- State: Washington
- County: Snohomish

Area
  - Total: 7.00 sq mi (18.13 km^{2})
  - Land: 6.93 sq mi (17.95 km^{2})
  - Water: 0.069 sq mi (0.18 km^{2})
- Elevation: 541 ft (165 m)

Population (2020)
  - Total: 3,140
  - Density: 453/sq mi (175/km^{2})
- Time zone: UTC-8 (Pacific (PST))
  - Summer (DST): UTC-7 (PDT)
- FIPS code: 53-20417
- GNIS feature ID: 1852942

High Bridge is a census-designated place (CDP) in Snohomish County, Washington, United States. The population was 3,140 at the 2020 census, up from 2,994 at the 2010 census. High Bridge includes the Echo Lake community and the former Echo Lake CDP, which was superseded by the larger High Bridge CDP in 2010.

== Geography ==
High Bridge is located at 47°47′57″N 122°1′26″W (47.799167, -122.023889).

According to the United States Census Bureau, the CDP has a total area of 7 square miles (18.13 km^{2}), of which, 6.93 square miles (17.95 km^{2}) of it is land and 0.07 square miles (0.18 km^{2}) of it (1%) is water.

== Demographics ==
Historical population
Census	Pop.	Note	%±
2000	849		—
2010	2,994		252.7%
2020	3,140		4.9%
U.S. Decennial Census; 1960 1970 1980 1990; 2000 2010 2020; Listed as Echo Lake in 2000

A community named Echo Lake was defined as a census designated place in the 2000 U.S. census. Echo Lake along with additional area was then incorporated into a new CDP named High Bridge prior to the 2010 U.S. census.

=== Racial and ethnic composition ===
High Bridge CDP, Washington – Racial and ethnic composition Note: the US Census treats Hispanic/Latino as an ethnic category. This table excludes Latinos from the racial categories and assigns them to a separate category. Hispanics/Latinos may be of any race.
Race / Ethnicity (NH = Non-Hispanic)	Pop 2000	Pop 2010	Pop 2020	% 2000	% 2010	% 2020
White alone (NH)	761	2,672	2,586	89.63%	89.25%	82.36%
Black or African American alone (NH)	3	19	15	0.35%	0.63%	0.48%
Native American or Alaska Native alone (NH)	5	12	17	0.59%	0.40%	0.54%
Asian alone (NH)	16	54	114	1.88%	1.80%	3.63%
Native Hawaiian or Pacific Islander alone (NH)	1	3	2	0.12%	0.10%	0.06%
Other race alone (NH)	0	3	19	0.00%	0.10%	0.61%
Mixed race or Multiracial (NH)	36	81	222	4.24%	2.71%	7.07%
Hispanic or Latino (any race)	27	150	165	3.18%	5.01%	5.25%
Total	849	2,994	3,140	100.00%	100.00%	100.00%

=== 2000 census ===
As of the census of 2000, there were 849 people, 275 households, and 237 families residing in the CDP. The population density was 495.8 people per square mile (191.7/km^{2}). There were 284 housing units at an average density of 165.9/sq mi (64.1/km^{2}). The racial makeup of the CDP was 91.28% White, 0.35% African American, 0.59% Native American, 2.00% Asian, 0.12% Pacific Islander, 1.06% from other races, and 4.59% from two or more races. Hispanic or Latino of any race were 3.18% of the population.

There were 275 households, out of which 44.4% had children under the age of 18 living with them, 74.5% were married couples living together, 8.7% had a female householder with no husband present, and 13.8% were non-families. 6.5% of all households were made up of individuals, and 1.1% had someone living alone who was 65 years of age or older. The average household size was 3.07 and the average family size was 3.20.

In the CDP, the age distribution of the population shows 29.6% under the age of 18, 5.2% from 18 to 24, 34.0% from 25 to 44, 25.1% from 45 to 64, and 6.1% who were 65 years of age or older. The median age was 36 years. For every 100 females, there were 107.6 males. In the population age 18 and over, for every 100 females there were 102.0 males.

The median income for a household in the CDP was $62,250, and the median income for a family was $72,917. Males had a median income of $45,769 versus $48,000 for females. The per capita income for the CDP was $24,216. About 2.0% of families and 2.7% of the population were below the poverty line, including none of those under age 18 and 10.2% of those age 65 or over.

== In the news ==
On March 3, 2008, four multimillion-dollar homes as part of the 2007 Seattle Street of Dreams were set on fire allegedly by the Earth Liberation Front (ELF) on Echo Lake Road, off State Highway 522.
