= Three Lakes, Washington =

- CDP
- Location of Three Lakes, Washington
- Coordinates: 47°56′16″N 121°59′42″W
- Country: United States
- State: Washington
- County: Snohomish

Area
  - Total: 10.2 sq mi (26.4 km^{2})
  - Land: 9.8 sq mi (25.4 km^{2})
  - Water: 0.39 sq mi (1.0 km^{2})
- Elevation: 486 ft (148 m)

Population (2020)
  - Total: 3,941
  - Density: 402/sq mi (155/km^{2})
- Time zone: UTC-8 (Pacific (PST))
  - Summer (DST): UTC-7 (PDT)
- ZIP Code: 98290
- Area code(s): 360, 564
- FIPS code: 53-71330
- GNIS feature ID: 1509013

Three Lakes is a census-designated place (CDP) in Snohomish County, Washington, United States. The population was 3,941 at the 2020 census.

== Geography ==
According to the United States Census Bureau, the CDP has a total area of 10.2 square miles (26.4 km^{2}), of which, 9.8 square miles (25.4 km^{2}) of it is land and 0.4 square miles (1.0 km^{2}) of it (3.92%) is water.

== Demographics ==
Historical population
Census	Pop.	Note	%±
2000	2,492		—
2010	3,184		27.8%
2020	3,941		23.8%
U.S. Decennial Census; 1970 1980 1990; 2000 2010

Three Lakes first appeared as a census designated place in the 2000 U.S. census.

=== Racial and ethnic composition ===
Three Lakes CDP, Washington – Racial and ethnic composition Note: the US Census treats Hispanic/Latino as an ethnic category. This table excludes Latinos from the racial categories and assigns them to a separate category. Hispanics/Latinos may be of any race.
Race / Ethnicity (NH = Non-Hispanic)	Pop 2000	Pop 2010	Pop 2020	% 2000	% 2010	% 2020
White alone (NH)	2,362	2,945	3,352	94.78%	92.49%	85.05%
Black or African American alone (NH)	2	10	17	0.08%	0.31%	0.43%
Native American or Alaska Native alone (NH)	19	14	9	0.76%	0.44%	0.23%
Asian alone (NH)	9	38	71	0.36%	1.19%	1.80%
Native Hawaiian or Pacific Islander alone (NH)	10	3	7	0.40%	0.09%	0.18%
Other race alone (NH)	2	5	14	0.08%	0.16%	0.36%
Mixed race or Multiracial (NH)	42	84	235	1.69%	2.64%	5.96%
Hispanic or Latino (any race)	46	85	236	1.85%	2.67%	5.99%
Total	2,492	3,184	3,941	100.00%	100.00%	100.00%

=== 2000 census ===
As of the census of 2000, there were 2,492 people, 885 households, and 700 families residing in the CDP. The population density was 254.0 people per square mile (98.1/km^{2}). There were 921 housing units at an average density of 93.9/sq mi (36.2/km^{2}). The racial makeup of the CDP was 95.95% White, 0.08% African American, 0.80% Native American, 0.36% Asian, 0.40% Pacific Islander, 0.44% from other races, and 1.97% from two or more races. Hispanic or Latino of any race were 1.85% of the population.

There were 885 households, out of which 40.6% had children under the age of 18 living with them, 69.3% were married couples living together, 5.3% had a female householder with no husband present, and 20.9% were non-families. 14.0% of all households were made up of individuals, and 3.8% had someone living alone who was 65 years of age or older. The average household size was 2.81 and the average family size was 3.14.

In the CDP, the age distribution of the population shows 27.4% under the age of 18, 6.9% from 18 to 24, 30.1% from 25 to 44, 28.3% from 45 to 64, and 7.3% who were 65 years of age or older. The median age was 39 years. For every 100 females, there were 111.5 males. For every 100 females age 18 and over, there were 109.1 males.

The median income for a household in the CDP was $71,080, and the median income for a family was $73,824. Males had a median income of $49,769 versus $37,813 for females. The per capita income for the CDP was $27,681. About 3.2% of families and 3.0% of the population were below the poverty line, including 2.1% of those under age 18 and 7.8% of those age 65 or over.
