= Snohomish County, Washington =

County in Washington, United States

- County
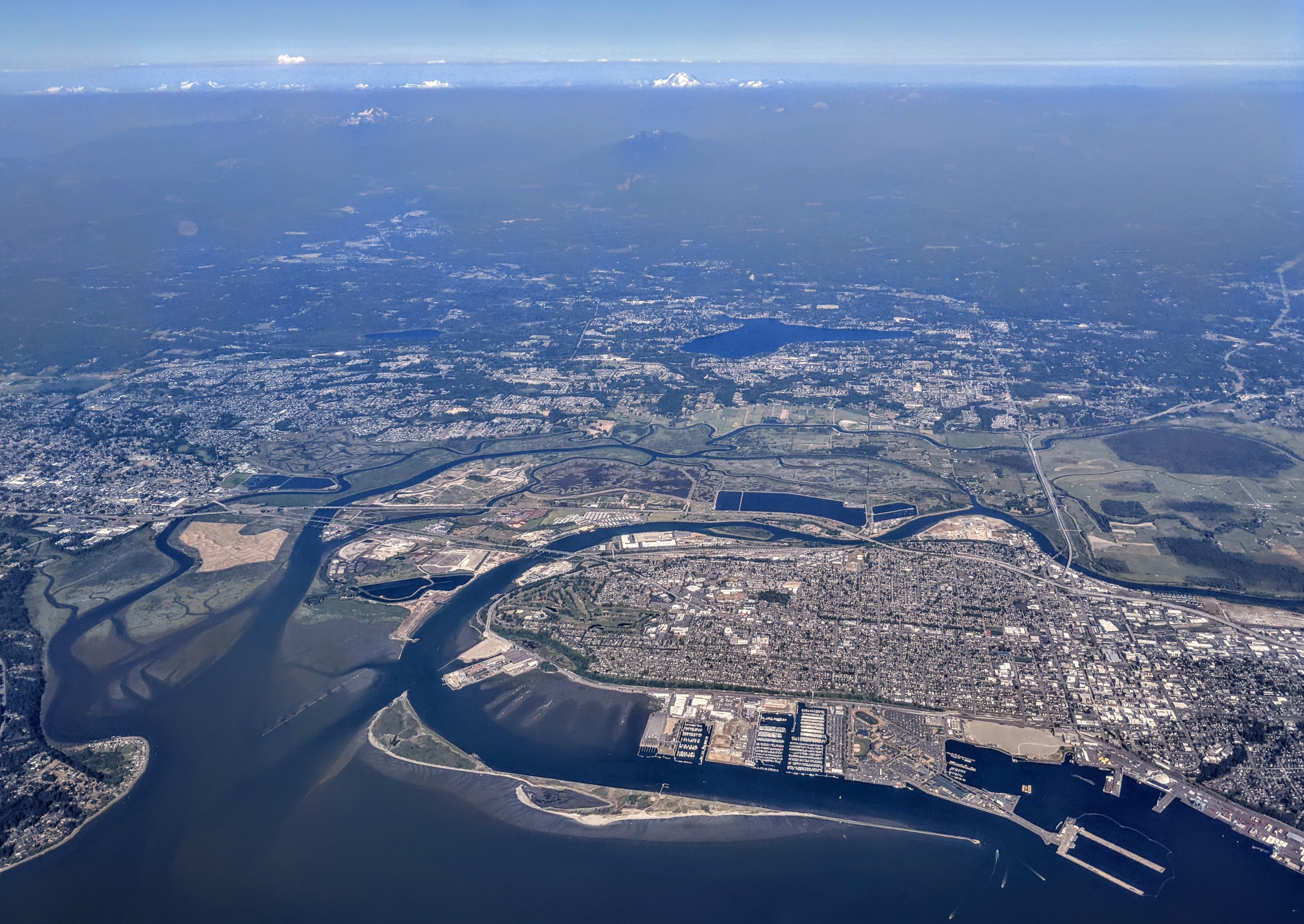
- Aerial view of the Snohomish River delta, including portions of Everett, Lake Stevens, and Marysville

- Flag Seal

- Location within the U.S. state of Washington
- Coordinates: 48°02′N 121°43′W
- Country: United States
- State: Washington
- Founded: January 14, 1861
- Named for: the Snohomish people
- Seat: Everett
- Largest city: Everett

Government
  - County Executive: Dave Somers (D)

Area
  - Total: 2,196 sq mi (5,690 km^{2})
  - Land: 2,087 sq mi (5,410 km^{2})
  - Water: 109 sq mi (280 km^{2}) 5.0%

Population (2020)
  - Total: 827,957
  - Estimate (2025): 870,656 ▲
  - Density: 384/sq mi (148/km^{2})
- Time zone: UTC−8 (Pacific)
  - Summer (DST): UTC−7 (PDT)
- Area code: 206, 360, 425, 564
- Congressional districts: 1st, 2nd, 8th
- Website: snohomishcountywa.gov

Snohomish County (/snoʊˈhoʊmɪʃ/) is a county located in the U.S. state of Washington. With a population of 827,957 as of the 2020 census, it is the third-most populous county in Washington, after nearby King and Pierce counties, and the 72nd-most populous in the United States. The county seat and largest city is Everett. The county forms part of the Seattle metropolitan area, which also includes King and Pierce counties to the south.

The county's western portion, facing Puget Sound and other inland waters of the Salish Sea, is home to the majority of its population and major cities. The eastern portion is rugged and includes portions of the Cascade Range, with few settlements along major rivers and most of it designated as part of the Mount Baker–Snoqualmie National Forest. Snohomish County is bound to the north by Skagit County, to the east by Chelan County, to the south by King County, and to the west by Kitsap and Island counties.

Snohomish County was created from a portion of Island County on January 14, 1861, and is named for the indigenous Snohomish people. It includes the Tulalip Indian Reservation, which was established by the 1855 Point Elliott Treaty, by which several indigenous Coast Salish groups were required to cede their lands and relocate to the reservation. The county seat was originally at the city of Snohomish. An 1897 election moved it to Everett. Since the mid-20th century, areas of Snohomish County have developed into an aerospace manufacturing center, largely due to the presence of Boeing in Everett. There are also bedroom communities for people who work in Seattle.

Snohomish County now has 18 incorporated cities and two towns with their own local governments, in addition to developed unincorporated areas. It is connected to nearby areas by roads (including Interstate 5), railways, and transit systems. The county government is led by a five-member county council and chief executive, all elected by voters to four-year terms.

== Etymology ==
"Snohomish" comes from the name of what was the largest Native American tribe in the area when European-American settlers arrived in the 19th century. The name is spelled Sduhubš (Sdoh-doh-hohbsh) in the Lushootseed language and its meaning is disputed with unclear origins. Federal Indian agent Dr. Charles M. Buchanan, who spent 21 years with the Tulalip, once said that he had "never met an Indian who could give a meaning to the word Snohomish". Chief William Shelton, the last hereditary tribal chief of the Snohomish tribe, claimed that it meant "lowland people", a name associated with the tribe's location on the waters of the Puget Sound. Other scholars have claimed it meant "a style of union among them", "the braves", or "Sleeping Waters".

The name is also used for the Snohomish River, which runs through part of the county, and the City of Snohomish, the former county seat that was renamed after the formation of the county. The current spelling of the name was adopted by the Surveyor General of Washington Territory in 1857, replacing alternative spellings used in some earlier documents and accounts. John Work of the Hudson's Bay Company recorded the name as "Sinnahmis" in 1824, while the Wilkes Expedition of 1841 used "Tuxpam" to describe the Snohomish River. The same river was named "Sinahomis" by Captain Henry Kellett in 1847, and was accepted in that spelling by the U.S. government for several years.

== History ==
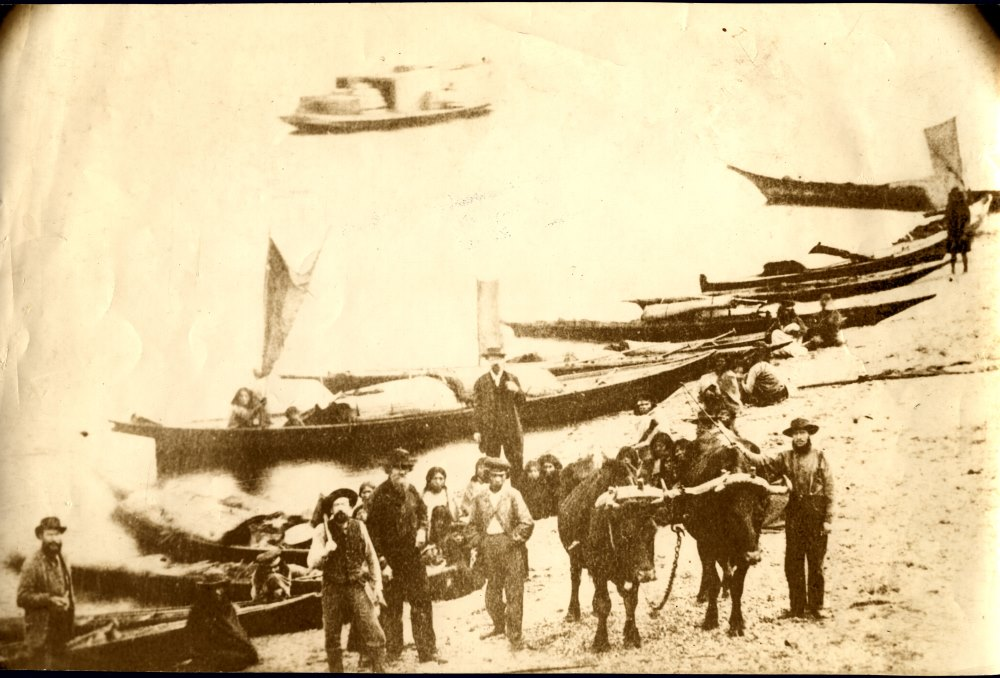
Canoes with settlers and Native Americans at Mukilteo Beach, c. 1861–62

Snohomish County was originally inhabited by several Coast Salish groups, predominantly settled along the western coastline and near the region's rivers. The Snohomish were the largest group and occupied an area from present-day Warm Beach to Shoreline, while Stillaguamish lived in the Stillaguamish River basin. The region was first charted and named by European explorers in the late 18th century, beginning with Captain George Vancouver and his British expedition. Vancouver arrived in Puget Sound and Port Gardner Bay on June 4, 1792, landing near present-day Everett.

The Treaty of Point Elliott was signed at present-day Mukilteo on January 22, 1855, marking the cession of Coast Salish territories in the Puget Sound lowlands. The Tulalip Indian Reservation was established to house the remaining tribes, including the Snohomish, Snoqualmie, and Skykomish. Snohomish County was created out of Island County's mainland areas and the northernmost portion of King County on January 14, 1861. The separation from Island County was the result of a petition by settlers to the territorial legislature that cited the difficulty of travel to Coupeville on Whidbey Island, the county seat at the time.

The new county was the first in Washington to have its boundaries defined by a land survey rather than natural boundaries. The territorial legislature designated Mukilteo, the area's largest settlement, as the temporary county seat in January 1861. The county government was permanently moved to Cadyville, later Snohomish, following an election on July 8. Residents north of the Snohomish River later proposed to be moved into Skagit County due to difficult travel to the county seat at Snohomish. After the incorporation of the city of Everett in 1893, the city's leaders attempted to move the county seat from Snohomish. A countywide general election on November 6, 1894, chose to relocate the county seat to Everett, amid controversy and allegations of illegal votes. After two years of litigation between the cities of Snohomish and Everett, the county seat was officially relocated to Everett in December 1896.

One of the first county censuses was taken in 1862 by Sheriff Salem A. Woods. Early important pioneers in the Snohomish County region included E. F. Cady of Snohomish, Emory C. Ferguson of Snohomish and Isaac Cathcart.

The early economy of Snohomish County relied on natural resources, namely timber and mining, alongside agriculture. The region was connected by railroads at the end of the 19th century, which also created new towns that experienced major population booms as emigrants arrived from other parts of the United States. The county was among the largest New Deal aid beneficiaries in Washington due to its troubled economy during the Great Depression; the Works Progress Administration built major projects around Snohomish County, while the Civilian Conservation Corps developed wilderness and recreational areas around several work camps.

During World War II, the county had several shipyards and airplane factories established to supply the United States Armed Forces. Several existing and new airfields were converted into military use, which would continue beyond the war. A post-war population boom brought new suburban development to Snohomish County, where bedroom communities were built alongside new highways to Seattle. In 1967, Boeing began construction of an aircraft assembly plant—the world's largest building—in Everett for its Boeing 747 program. The U.S. Navy located a major homeport in Everett that opened in 1994.

== Geography ==
Map of Snohomish County, showing incorporated places and major highways

Snohomish County is part of the Puget Sound region of Western Washington, bordered to the south by King County, to the west by Puget Sound and other inland waters, to the north by Skagit County, and to the east by the Chelan County at the crest of the Cascade Range. According to the United States Census Bureau, the county has a total square area of approximately 2,196 square miles (5,690 km^{2}), of which 2,087 square miles (5,410 km^{2}) is land and 109 square miles (280 km^{2}), or 5.0%, is water. It is the 13th largest county in Washington by land area and is larger than the states of Delaware and Rhode Island.

The county's surface is covered by plains and rolling hills in the west, where the majority of settlements are, and mountainous terrain in the east. The Cascade Range passes through the eastern part of the county and is largely protected from development as part of the Mount Baker–Snoqualmie National Forest. The mountain range includes the highest point in Snohomish County: Glacier Peak, at 10,541 feet (3,212.90 m) above sea level. Several major rivers originate in the Cascades and flow west towards Puget Sound and other parts of the Salish Sea, including the Stillaguamish and Snohomish (fed by the Skykomish and Snoqualmie rivers). These rivers form several valleys used for agriculture that occasionally flood during major weather events, such as atmospheric rivers.

=== Climate ===
The lowland areas of western Snohomish County generally has a temperate Mediterranean climate similar to the rest of the central Puget Sound region with dry summers and wet winters. The county's weather is heavily influenced by maritime systems, pushed by prevailing westerly winds but dampened by the Olympic Mountains. The mean monthly temperatures for the county range from 20 to 40 °F (−7 to 4 °C) during the winter and 55 to 65 °F (13 to 18 °C) in the summer. The record highest temperatures were set during a June 2021 heat wave, with highs of up to 109 °F (43 °C) recorded in several areas. Annual precipitation ranges from 35 inches (89 cm) in the west to 180 inches (460 cm) in the upper elevations of the Cascades; the majority of the region's precipitation falls between October and March. The county's lowlands also has an average annual snowfall ranging from 10 to 20 inches (25 to 51 cm). The Puget Sound Convergence Zone, a known meteorological phenomenon, runs through southwestern Snohomish County and causes narrow bands of precipitation.

=== Flora and fauna ===
Approximately 68 percent of land in Snohomish County is classified as forestland, which is predominantly located in the eastern portions. These forests are dominated by conifer species such as Douglas firs, hemlocks, and cedars, with pockets of deciduous species in logged areas.

== Demographics ==
Historical population
Census	Pop.	Note	%±
1870	599		—
1880	1,387		131.6%
1890	8,514		513.8%
1900	23,950		181.3%
1910	59,209		147.2%
1920	67,690		14.3%
1930	78,861		16.5%
1940	88,754		12.5%
1950	111,580		25.7%
1960	172,199		54.3%
1970	265,236		54.0%
1980	337,720		27.3%
1990	465,642		37.9%
2000	606,024		30.1%
2010	713,335		17.7%
2020	827,957		16.1%
2025 (est.)	870,656	▲	5.2%
U.S. Decennial Census; 1790–1960, 1900–1990, 1990–2000, 2010–2020

A 2007 report from the county government projected that Snohomish County would grow to 938,000 residents by 2025 and would be able to accommodate population growth within its existing urban areas.

=== 2020 census ===
As of the 2020 census, there were 827,957 people, 306,828 households, and 211,519 families residing in the county. The population density was 396.8 people per square mile (153.2 people/km^{2}). There were 321,523 housing units at an average density of 146.4 units per square mile (56.5 units/km^{2}).

Snohomish County, Washington – Racial and ethnic composition Note: the US Census treats Hispanic/Latino as an ethnic category. This table excludes Latinos from the racial categories and assigns them to a separate category. Hispanics/Latinos may be of any race.
Race / Ethnicity (NH = Non-Hispanic)	Pop 2000	Pop 2010	Pop 2020	% 2000	% 2010	% 2020
White alone (NH)	505,198	529,814	528,415	83.36%	74.27%	63.82%
Black or African American alone (NH)	9,803	17,299	28,392	1.62%	2.42%	3.43%
Native American or Alaska Native alone (NH)	7,666	8,451	7,993	1.26%	1.18%	0.97%
Asian alone (NH)	34,748	62,760	100,654	5.73%	8.80%	12.16%
Pacific Islander alone (NH)	1,613	3,002	4,851	0.27%	0.42%	0.59%
Other race alone (NH)	1,069	1,220	4,805	0.18%	0.17%	0.58%
Mixed race or Multiracial (NH)	17,337	26,540	57,203	2.86%	3.72%	6.91%
Hispanic or Latino (any race)	28,590	64,249	95,644	4.72%	9.01%	11.55%
Total	606,024	713,335	827,957	100.00%	100.00%	100.00%

The racial makeup of the county was 66.0% White, 3.5% Black or African American, 1.3% American Indian and Alaska Native, 12.3% Asian, 5.4% from some other race, and 10.8% from two or more races. Hispanic or Latino residents of any race comprised 11.6% of the population.

Of the residents, 22.7% were under the age of 18 and 14.4% were 65 years of age or older; the median age was 38.2 years. For every 100 females there were 99.7 males, and for every 100 females age 18 and over there were 98.3 males. 88.2% of residents lived in urban areas and 11.8% lived in rural areas.

There were 306,828 households in the county, of which 33.1% had children under the age of 18 living with them and 22.5% had a female householder with no spouse or partner present. About 23.1% of all households were made up of individuals and 9.0% had someone living alone who was 65 years of age or older.

Of those housing units, 4.6% were vacant. Among occupied housing units, 66.4% were owner-occupied and 33.6% were renter-occupied. The homeowner vacancy rate was 0.8% and the rental vacancy rate was 4.6%.

=== 2010 census ===
As of the 2010 census, there were 713,335 people, 268,325 households, and 182,282 families residing in the county. The population density was 341.8 people per square mile (132.0 people/km^{2}). There were 286,659 housing units at an average density of 137.3 units per square mile (53.0 units/km^{2}). The racial makeup of the county was 78.4% white, 8.9% Asian, 2.5% black or African American, 1.4% Indigenous, 0.4% Pacific islander, 3.8% from other races, and 4.6% from two or more races. Those of Hispanic or Latino origin made up 9.0% of the population. In terms of ethnicity, 20.3% reported German ancestry, 12.6% Irish, 12.2% English, 8.2% Norwegian, and 3.6% American heritage.

Of the 268,325 households, 35.2% had children under the age of 18 living with them, 52.4% were married couples living together, 10.4% had a female householder with no husband present, 32.1% were non-families, and 24.3% of all households were made up of individuals. The average household size was 2.62 and the average family size was 3.12. The median age was 37.1 years.

The median income for a household in the county was $66,300 and the median income for a family was $77,479. Males had a median income of $56,152 versus $41,621 for females. The per capita income for the county was $30,635. About 5.9% of families and 8.4% of the population were below the poverty line, including 10.8% of those under age 18 and 7.3% of those age 65 or over.

=== Homelessness ===
Snohomish County participates in the annual Point-In-Time Count, a program funded by the U.S. Department of Housing and Urban Development to conduct a census of homeless individuals on a designated day. The Point-in-Time Count on January 22, 2024, identified 1,140 people in 890 households who were homeless—either without shelter, in transitional housing, or in a shelter. The county government operates 683 year-round shelter beds and increases capacity during inclement weather; the county government purchased two former motels in 2022 to provide an additional 130 rooms.

== Law and government ==
Snohomish County is a home rule charter county with three branches: the executive, legislative, and judicial. The county government's powers and structure is defined by a charter that is updated every 10 years with amendments that are presented to voters for approval. The county executive and council seats are partisan positions with four-year terms; other positions elected by voters are generally non-partisan. Most county offices have a term limit of three terms.

=== County Executive ===
The county executive is Dave Somers, a Democrat. Somers is a former Snohomish County Councilmember and took office as county executive on January 4, 2016, having won the seat from incumbent and fellow Democrat John Lovick.

The county executive seat was chartered in the 1979. The first county executive was conservative Democrat Willis Tucker of Snohomish from 1980 to 1992. Following Tucker, the next county executive was Democrat Bob Drewel from 1992 to 2004, followed by Democrat Aaron Reardon from 2004 to 2013. Reardon resigned on May 31, 2013, amid a series of political scandals, and was replaced by former Snohomish County Sheriff and state legislator John Lovick for the remainder of his term.

=== County Council ===
The county council has five members who are elected to four-year terms, each representing a geographical district that is redrawn every 10 years. As of 2023, its members are:

- Nate Nehring (R) – district 1
- Megan Dunn (D) – district 2
- Strom Peterson (D) – district 3
- Jared Mead (D) – district 4
- Sam Low (R) – district 5

=== Courts ===
The judicial branch of the county government is divided between two courts: the Superior Court and District Court. The number of judges in each court is set by the state legislature as recommended by a panel of judges and analysis of the courts. The Superior Court has 17 judges elected to four-year terms and primarily handle major cases, including those that involve felonies and juveniles, as well as some civil cases. The District Court has nine judges that handle infractions, small claims, and domestic violence; it is divided into four geographical divisions.

=== Politics ===
Snohomish County has been a reliably Democratic county in recent presidential elections (albeit to a lesser degree than neighboring King County and Seattle). It has voted Democratic all but four times since 1932, with those four occasions being national Republican landslides in which the GOP candidate won over 400 electoral votes. It has not voted for a Republican since George H. W. Bush in 1988.

The county's primary elections were historically held in June, but were moved to August in 2008. In the years since, turnout has been under 45% except for 2020; during odd-numbered years with municipal and local races, turnout has been under 27%.

United States presidential election results for Snohomish County, Washington
Year	Republican		Democratic		Third party(ies)	
Year	No.	%	No.	%	No.	%
1892	1,488	34.93%	1,390	32.63%	1,382	32.44%
1896	1,871	39.19%	2,858	59.87%	45	0.94%
1900	2,961	51.80%	2,478	43.35%	277	4.85%
1904	6,025	71.69%	1,405	16.72%	974	11.59%
1908	5,659	55.64%	2,974	29.24%	1,538	15.12%
1912	3,007	15.68%	3,846	20.05%	12,329	64.27%
1916	8,625	42.68%	8,390	41.52%	3,192	15.80%
1920	10,793	52.48%	3,056	14.86%	6,718	32.66%
1924	10,484	48.82%	1,548	7.21%	9,441	43.97%
1928	16,516	67.39%	7,419	30.27%	572	2.33%
1932	9,310	30.07%	18,352	59.27%	3,301	10.66%
1936	8,882	24.97%	25,081	70.51%	1,606	4.52%
1940	13,638	33.60%	26,185	64.52%	762	1.88%
1944	15,182	35.20%	27,345	63.40%	603	1.40%
1948	17,018	36.79%	25,924	56.04%	3,318	7.17%
1952	26,749	47.94%	28,518	51.11%	534	0.96%
1956	30,052	48.22%	31,950	51.26%	325	0.52%
1960	33,731	46.10%	38,793	53.02%	639	0.87%
1964	25,902	31.82%	55,013	67.58%	490	0.60%
1968	36,252	41.47%	44,019	50.35%	7,153	8.18%
1972	60,032	57.27%	39,471	37.66%	5,318	5.07%
1976	55,375	47.95%	55,623	48.16%	4,490	3.89%
1980	66,153	48.68%	52,003	38.26%	17,751	13.06%
1984	90,362	56.83%	66,728	41.97%	1,905	1.20%
1988	84,158	50.34%	80,694	48.27%	2,313	1.38%
1992	69,137	30.67%	88,643	39.32%	67,650	30.01%
1996	81,885	37.06%	109,624	49.61%	29,451	13.33%
2000	109,615	43.68%	129,612	51.65%	11,740	4.68%
2004	134,317	45.53%	156,468	53.04%	4,212	1.43%
2008	126,722	39.56%	187,294	58.47%	6,317	1.97%
2012	133,016	40.33%	188,516	57.16%	8,285	2.51%
2016	128,255	36.16%	185,227	52.22%	41,252	11.63%
2020	166,428	37.93%	256,728	58.51%	15,640	3.56%
2024	161,371	38.59%	240,099	57.41%	16,751	4.01%

== Education ==
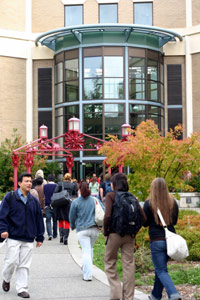
Snoqualmie Hall, a building shared by Edmonds College and Central Washington University, 2007

Snohomish County has 15 school districts that provide public K–12 education to over 100,000 pupils across the county as of the 2022–23 school year. The number of school districts in the county has declined as consolidations have eliminated smaller rural ones; the remaining rural districts have seen growth since the COVID-19 pandemic began in 2020 while enrollment in urban and suburban districts declined. The largest school district in Snohomish County is the Edmonds School District, followed closely by the Everett School District; both have an enrollment of over 20,000 students. The smallest district is the Index School District, which had 21 enrolled students in 2022–23 and does not have its own high school. Snohomish County also had 68 private schools in 2018, of which many were affiliated with religious organizations or offered alternative education methods.

The county has 15 colleges and university programs that provide post-secondary education. Three community colleges serve students in Snohomish County and offer two-year degrees and other programs: as of the 2023–24 school year, Cascadia College in Bothell has 1,826 enrolled students; Edmonds College in Lynnwood has 5,159 enrolled students; and Everett Community College in North Everett has 5,301 enrolled students. Everett was established in 1941 and is the oldest community college in the county; it was followed in 1967 by Edmonds and 1994 by Cascadia. The county also hosts off-site campuses for other institutions: the Northwest Indian College has a branch campus on the Tulalip Indian Reservation; and Columbia College has classes at Naval Station Everett's support complex in Marysville.

Washington State University (WSU), a major public university, opened their Everett campus in 2017. The campus is co-located with Everett Community College and the Everett University Center, which was transferred to WSU control in 2012 and offers bachelor's and master's degree programs for regional universities. Snohomish County had previously been one of the most populous counties in the U.S. without a post-secondary institute that offered four-year baccalaureate and advanced degree programs. The Seattle-based University of Washington (UW) had previously accepted a 2007 proposal from the state legislature to study and develop a branch campus in the county. UW selected finalist sites in Everett and Marysville, but halted further planning in 2008 due to the state government's inability to fund the $800 million project. Local officials approached WSU in 2011 with a proposal to gradually develop an Everett campus, which was authorized by the state legislature after UW backed out.

UW also has a Bothell campus that it shares with Cascadia College and was established in 1990 and underwent major growth in the 2010s. The Bothell campus draws up to 30 percent of its students from Snohomish County. Since 1975, Edmonds College has been the host of the Lynnwood branch of Central Washington University, which offers bachelor's degrees for transferring students. The branch moved into Snoqualmie Hall, a dedicated building on the Edmonds College campus, in 2002. Edmonds College launched the first of its four-year Bachelor of Applied Science degree programs in 2017.

== Media ==
Residents receive much of their information from Seattle-based media, the most prominent of which include The Seattle Times and regional TV news stations. The Everett Herald is the county's most popular daily newspaper, while weekly newspapers such as the Snohomish County Tribune, Stanwood Camano News and Edmonds Beacon serve their respective communities.

The county is part of the Seattle broadcast television market and is served by several regional television news stations, including KOMO, KING, KIRO, KCTS, and KCPQ.

Local radio stations based in the county include KKXA, KRKO, KSER, and KWYZ.

There are also smaller local publications, with significant online presences: My Edmonds News, My Everett News, The Mountlake Terrace News, News of Mill Creek, Mill Creek View, Lynnwood Today and Lynnwood Times.

The county has been used as a filming location for several movies and television series since the mid-20th century.

== Transportation ==
=== Roads ===
Snohomish County has two Interstate Highways, one U.S. route, and several state routes that connect it to other areas. The county's main highway is Interstate 5 (I-5), which runs north–south for 40 miles (64 km) and travels through several major cities. Other major routes are primarily north–south routes, including State Route 9 on the east side of the urbanized area; State Route 99 to the west of I-5; and State Route 527 in Mill Creek and Bothell. The only complete east–west route is U.S. Route 2.

- Interstate 5
- Interstate 405
- U.S. Route 2
- State Route 9
- State Route 92
- State Route 96
- State Route 99
- State Route 104
- State Route 203
- State Route 204
- State Route 522
- State Route 524
- State Route 525
- State Route 526
- State Route 527
- State Route 528
- State Route 529
- State Route 530
- State Route 531
- State Route 532

The county government maintains approximately 1,600 miles (2,600 km) of roads and 200 bridges. The countywide numbered street grid originates in Everett and was implemented beginning in the 1970s during the rollout of the 911 emergency phone number system. By the late 1990s, some roads had reverted to their historical names—either officially or by using commemorative signs—due to local backlash.

=== Public transportation ===
Snohomish County is served by several public transit systems that connect to each other at regional hubs, including Everett Station and Lynnwood City Center station. The primary provider is Community Transit, which operates local service within the county (apart from the city of Everett) and commuter service to the Boeing Everett Factory and Downtown Seattle. Sound Transit, a regional transit agency, provides light rail, commuter rail, and express bus services that connect to regional destinations in Seattle and Bellevue. Other providers include Everett Transit, a municipal system serving the city of Everett; Island Transit, which connects Camano Island to Stanwood and Everett; and Skagit Transit, which operates an inter-county route from Everett to Mount Vernon.

The regional Link light rail system was extended into Snohomish County with the opening of the Lynnwood Link Extension on August 30, 2024, which includes stations in Mountlake Terrace and Lynnwood on the 1 Line and 2 Line. The project was approved in a 2008 ballot measure and began construction in 2019. An extension to Everett with six or seven stations was approved in the regional Sound Transit 3 ballot measure in 2016 and is expected to open between 2037 and 2041. Community Transit operates a bus rapid transit network called Swift with three lines as of 2024: the Blue Line, which opened in 2009 from Everett to Shoreline along State Route 99; the Green Line from the Boeing Everett Factory to Bothell via Airport Road and State Route 527; and the Orange Line in Lynnwood and Mill Creek, which opened in 2024. A fourth line, the Gold Line, is planned to open by 2029 and connect Everett to Marysville and Smokey Point.

Sound Transit also runs four daily Sounder commuter trains at peak hours between Everett Station and King Street Station in Seattle, stopping at Mukilteo and Edmonds. Intercity rail service is provided by Amtrak, which has two lines operating within Snohomish County: Amtrak Cascades between Seattle and Vancouver, British Columbia, stopping in Edmonds, Everett, and Stanwood station; and the Empire Builder between Seattle and Chicago, Illinois, stopping in Edmonds and Everett. Intercity bus service is provided by Greyhound Lines and Northwestern Trailways from Everett Station.

=== Airports ===
Snohomish County has one major airport: Paine Field, otherwise known as Snohomish County Airport, which has had passenger service since March 2019.

There are three smaller public airports that are open to general aviation: Arlington Municipal Airport in Arlington, Darrington Municipal Airport in Darrington, and Harvey Field in Snohomish. The county also has several private airports, including the Frontier Airpark and Green Valley Airfield in Granite Falls. The Martha Lake Airport in Martha Lake was a former private airport that was closed in 2000 and was converted into a county park that opened in 2010.

=== Ferries ===
Snohomish County is also connected to adjacent counties by two ferry routes operated by Washington State Ferries. The Edmonds–Kingston ferry carries SR 104 between Edmonds and Kingston in Kitsap County. The Mukilteo–Clinton ferry carries SR 525 from Mukilteo to Clinton on Whidbey Island.

== Communities ==
=== Cities ===
- Arlington
- Bothell (partly in King County)
- Brier
- Edmonds
- Everett (county seat)
- Gold Bar
- Granite Falls
- Lake Stevens
- Lynnwood
- Marysville
- Mill Creek
- Monroe
- Mountlake Terrace
- Mukilteo
- Snohomish
- Stanwood
- Sultan
- Woodway

=== Towns ===
- Darrington
- Index

=== Census-designated places ===
- Alderwood Manor
- Arlington Heights
- Bothell East
- Bothell West
- Bryant
- Bunk Foss
- Canyon Creek
- Cathcart
- Cavalero
- Chain Lake
- Clearview
- Eastmont
- Esperance
- Fobes Hill
- Hat Island
- High Bridge
- Kayak Point
- Lake Bosworth
- Lake Cassidy
- Lake Goodwin
- Lake Ketchum
- Lake Roesiger
- Lake Stickney
- Larch Way
- Lochsloy
- Machias
- Maltby
- Martha Lake
- May Creek
- Meadowdale
- Mill Creek East
- Monroe North
- North Lynnwood
- North Marysville
- North Sultan
- Northwest Stanwood
- Oso
- Picnic Point
- Silvana
- Silver Firs
- Sisco Heights
- Startup
- Sunday Lake
- Swede Heaven
- Three Lakes
- Verlot
- Warm Beach
- Woods Creek

=== Unincorporated communities ===
- Florence
- Fortson
- Galena
- Getchell
- Hazel
- Reiter
- Robe
- Silverton
- Sisco
- Trafton
- Tulalip Indian Reservation

== See also ==
- Isaac Cathcart
- National Register of Historic Places listings in Snohomish County, Washington
- Robe Canyon Historic Trail

== Bibliography ==
- Cameron, David A.; LeWarne, Charles P.; May, M. Allan; et al. (2005). Snohomish County: An Illustrated History. Index, Washington: Kelcema Books LLC. ISBN 978-0-9766700-0-1. OCLC 62728798.
