= Maltby, Washington =

- Census-designated place (CDP)
- Location of Maltby, Washington
- Coordinates: 47°48′8″N 122°6′15″W
- Country: United States
- State: Washington
- County: Snohomish

Area
  - Total: 16.8 sq mi (43.6 km^{2})
  - Land: 16.8 sq mi (43.4 km^{2})
  - Water: 0.077 sq mi (0.2 km^{2})
- Elevation: 397 ft (121 m)

Population (2020)
  - Total: 11,277
  - Density: 673/sq mi (260/km^{2})
- Time zone: UTC-8 (Pacific (PST))
  - Summer (DST): UTC-7 (PDT)
- ZIP Code: 98296
- Area code: 360, 564
- FIPS code: 53-42415
- GNIS feature ID: 1512425

Maltby is a census-designated place (CDP) in Snohomish County, Washington. The population was 11,277 at the 2020 census.

== History ==
Maltby was first settled in 1887 after the arrival of the Seattle, Lake Shore and Eastern Railway, which was built between Seattle and the Canadian border. A work camp at the top of a hill in the area was originally named Earl; it later became known as Yew. Real estate developer Robert Maltby purchased land in the area in 1890 and subdivided it into lots for sale; the local post office was renamed to Maltby in 1893. A sawmill was constructed in the settlement and operated until the early 20th century.

Several proposals to incorporate Maltby as a city were submitted in the 1990s and 2000s amid concerns about residential development in the rural area. A 2005 proposal encompassed an area of 42 square miles (110 km^{2})—far larger than any city in Snohomish County—with a population of 25,000.

== Geography ==
Maltby is located north of Woodinville and south of Snohomish, at the intersection of State Route 522 and State Route 524. It uses Snohomish and Woodinville addresses and is served by city services from Monroe.

According to the United States Census Bureau, the CDP has a total area of 16.8 square miles (43.6 km^{2}), of which, 16.8 square miles (43.4 km^{2}) of it is land and 0.1 square miles (0.2 km^{2}) of it (0.36%) is water.

== Demographics ==
Historical population
| Census | Pop. | Note | %± |
|---|---|---|---|
| 2000 | 8,267 | | — |
| 2010 | 10,830 | | 31.0% |
| 2020 | 11,277 | | 4.1% |
U.S. Decennial Census; 1970 1980 1990; 2000 2010

Maltby first appeared as a census designated place in the 2000 U.S. census.

=== Racial and ethnic composition ===
Maltby CDP, Washington – Racial and ethnic composition Note: the US Census treats Hispanic/Latino as an ethnic category. This table excludes Latinos from the racial categories and assigns them to a separate category. Hispanics/Latinos may be of any race.
| Race / Ethnicity (NH = Non-Hispanic) | Pop 2000 | Pop 2010 | Pop 2020 | % 2000 | % 2010 | % 2020 |
|---|---|---|---|---|---|---|
| White alone (NH) | 7,673 | 9,696 | 9,056 | 92.81% | 89.53% | 80.31% |
| Black or African American alone (NH) | 23 | 35 | 45 | 0.28% | 0.32% | 0.40% |
| Native American or Alaska Native alone (NH) | 38 | 51 | 48 | 0.46% | 0.47% | 0.43% |
| Asian alone (NH) | 196 | 386 | 616 | 2.37% | 3.56% | 5.46% |
| Native Hawaiian or Pacific Islander alone (NH) | 8 | 12 | 16 | 0.10% | 0.11% | 0.14% |
| Other race alone (NH) | 11 | 23 | 65 | 0.13% | 0.21% | 0.58% |
| Mixed race or Multiracial (NH) | 142 | 248 | 756 | 1.72% | 2.29% | 6.70% |
| Hispanic or Latino (any race) | 176 | 379 | 675 | 2.13% | 3.50% | 5.99% |
| Total | 8,267 | 10,830 | 11,277 | 100.00% | 100.00% | 100.00% |

=== 2020 census ===
As of the 2020 census, Maltby had a population of 11,277. The median age was 44.7 years. 21.0% of residents were under the age of 18 and 17.2% of residents were 65 years of age or older. For every 100 females there were 102.9 males, and for every 100 females age 18 and over there were 101.0 males age 18 and over.

88.3% of residents lived in urban areas, while 11.7% lived in rural areas.

There were 3,970 households in Maltby, of which 31.5% had children under the age of 18 living in them. Of all households, 70.1% were married-couple households, 12.1% were households with a male householder and no spouse or partner present, and 12.3% were households with a female householder and no spouse or partner present. About 14.1% of all households were made up of individuals and 6.3% had someone living alone who was 65 years of age or older.

There were 4,076 housing units, of which 2.6% were vacant. The homeowner vacancy rate was 0.8% and the rental vacancy rate was 2.7%.

Racial composition as of the 2020 census
| Race | Number | Percent |
|---|---|---|
| White | 9,224 | 81.8% |
| Black or African American | 49 | 0.4% |
| American Indian and Alaska Native | 59 | 0.5% |
| Asian | 625 | 5.5% |
| Native Hawaiian and Other Pacific Islander | 18 | 0.2% |
| Some other race | 254 | 2.3% |
| Two or more races | 1,048 | 9.3% |

=== 2000 census ===
As of the census of 2000, there were 8,267 people, 2,824 households, and 2,335 families residing in the CDP. The population density was 492.9 people per square mile (190.3/km^{2}). There were 2,897 housing units at an average density of 172.7/sq mi (66.7/km^{2}). The racial makeup of the CDP was 94.12% White, 0.29% African American, 0.47% Native American, 2.38% Asian, 0.16% Pacific Islander, 0.64% from other races, and 1.94% from two or more races. Hispanic or Latino of any race were 2.13% of the population.

There were 2,824 households, out of which 41.9% had children under the age of 18 living with them, 74.6% were married couples living together, 4.5% had a female householder with no husband present, and 17.3% were non-families. 12.3% of all households were made up of individuals, and 2.8% had someone living alone who was 65 years of age or older. The average household size was 2.93 and the average family size was 3.19.

In the CDP, the age distribution of the population shows 28.5% under the age of 18, 5.7% from 18 to 24, 31.3% from 25 to 44, 28.5% from 45 to 64, and 6.0% who were 65 years of age or older. The median age was 38 years. For every 100 females, there were 104.4 males. For every 100 females age 18 and over, there were 105.1 males.

The median income for a household in the CDP was $77,534, and the median income for a family was $80,543. Males had a median income of $53,209 versus $36,719 for females. The per capita income for the CDP was $29,330. About 1.9% of families and 3.6% of the population were below the poverty line, including 4.1% of those under age 18 and 6.2% of those age 65 or over. Based on per capita income, Maltby ranks 40th of 522 ranked areas in the state of Washington.

== Tourism ==
A small shopping district is located at the center of Maltby. This includes a cafe located in a former school gymnasium and several boutique shops in the former Maltby School.
