= Woods Creek, Washington =

- CDP
- Location of Woods Creek, Washington
- Coordinates: 47°53′15″N 121°53′50″W
- Country: United States
- State: Washington
- County: Snohomish

Area
  - Total: 12.5 sq mi (32.3 km^{2})
  - Land: 12.4 sq mi (32.2 km^{2})
  - Water: 0.039 sq mi (0.1 km^{2})
- Elevation: 367 ft (112 m)

Population (2020)
  - Total: 6,017
  - Density: 484/sq mi (187/km^{2})
- Time zone: UTC-8 (Pacific (PST))
  - Summer (DST): UTC-7 (PDT)
- FIPS code: 53-79825
- GNIS feature ID: 1852961

Woods Creek is a census-designated place (CDP) in Snohomish County, Washington, United States. The population was 6,017 at the 2020 census.

== Geography ==
According to the United States Census Bureau, the CDP has a total area of 12.5 square miles (32.3 km^{2}), of which, 12.4 square miles (32.2 km^{2}) of it is land and 0.04 square miles (0.1 km^{2}) of it (0.24%) is water.

== Demographics ==
Historical population
| Census | Pop. | Note | %± |
|---|---|---|---|
| 2000 | 4,502 | | — |
U.S. Decennial Census; 1970 1980 1990; 2000 2010

Woods Creek first appeared as a census designated place in the 2000 U.S. census.

=== 2000 census ===
As of the census of 2000, there were 4,502 people, 1,518 households, and 1,243 families residing in the CDP. The population density was 362.3 people per square mile (139.8/km^{2}). There were 1,578 housing units at an average density of 127.0/sq mi (49.0/km^{2}). The racial makeup of the CDP was 93.8% White, 0.1% African American, 0.6% Native American, 0.7% Asian, 0.2% Pacific Islander, 2.4% from other races, and 2.2% from two or more races. Hispanic or Latino of any race were 4.6% of the population.

There were 1,518 households, out of which 41.3% had children under the age of 18 living with them, 70.4% were married couples living together, 7.8% had a female householder with no husband present, and 18.1% were non-families. 13.0% of all households were made up of individuals, and 3.5% had someone living alone who was 65 years of age or older. The average household size was 2.97 and the average family size was 3.25.

In the CDP, the age distribution of the population shows 29.9% under the age of 18, 7.0% from 18 to 24, 30.8% from 25 to 44, 25.1% from 45 to 64, and 7.2% who were 65 years of age or older. The median age was 36 years. For every 100 females, there were 101.6 males. For every 100 females age 18 and over, there were 99.4 males.

The median income for a household in the CDP was $66,139, and the median income for a family was $68,424. Males had a median income of $50,756 versus $27,148 for females. The per capita income for the CDP was $25,582. About 2.5% of families and 4.6% of the population were below the poverty line, including 4.3% of those under age 18 and none of those age 65 or over.
