= Chain Lake, Washington =

- CDP
- Location of Chain Lake, Washington.
- Coordinates: 47°54′11″N 121°59′13″W
- Country: United States
- State: Washington
- County: Snohomish

Area
  - Total: 10.60 sq mi (27.46 km^{2})
  - Land: 10.55 sq mi (27.33 km^{2})
  - Water: 0.050 sq mi (0.13 km^{2})

Population (2010)
  - Total: 3,741
  - Density: 354.5/sq mi (136.9/km^{2})
- Time zone: UTC-8 (Pacific (PST))
  - Summer (DST): UTC-7 (PDT)
- GNIS feature ID: 2584957

Chain Lake is a census-designated place (CDP) in Snohomish County, Washington, United States. As of the 2020 census, Chain Lake had a population of 4,806.

== Geography ==
Chain Lake is located at 47°54′11″N 121°59′13″W (47.903093, -121.987047).

According to the United States Census Bureau, the CDP has a total area of 10.60 square miles (27.46 km^{2}), of which, 10.55 square miles (27.33 km^{2}) of it is land and 0.05 square miles (0.13 km^{2}) of it (0.47%) is water.

== Demographics ==
Historical population
| Census | Pop. | Note | %± |
|---|---|---|---|
| 2010 | 3,741 | | — |
| 2020 | 4,806 | | 28.5% |
U.S. Decennial Census; 2000 2010

Chain Lake first appeared as a census designated place in the 2010 U.S. census.

=== Racial and ethnic composition ===
Chain Lake CDP, Washington – Racial and ethnic composition Note: the US Census treats Hispanic/Latino as an ethnic category. This table excludes Latinos from the racial categories and assigns them to a separate category. Hispanics/Latinos may be of any race.
| Race / Ethnicity (NH = Non-Hispanic) | Pop 2010 | Pop 2020 | % 2010 | % 2020 |
|---|---|---|---|---|
| White alone (NH) | 3,388 | 3,947 | 90.56% | 82.13% |
| Black or African American alone (NH) | 12 | 25 | 0.32% | 0.52% |
| Native American or Alaska Native alone (NH) | 29 | 25 | 0.78% | 0.52% |
| Asian alone (NH) | 31 | 81 | 0.83% | 1.69% |
| Native Hawaiian or Pacific Islander alone (NH) | 0 | 11 | 0.00% | 0.23% |
| Other race alone (NH) | 8 | 30 | 0.21% | 0.62% |
| Mixed race or Multiracial (NH) | 113 | 349 | 3.02% | 7.26% |
| Hispanic or Latino (any race) | 160 | 338 | 4.28% | 7.03% |
| Total | 3,741 | 4,806 | 100.00% | 100.00% |
