= Washington State Route 531 =

State highway in Snohomish County, Washington, US

State Route 531
- SR 531 highlighted in red

Route information
- Auxiliary route of I-5
- Maintained by WSDOT
- Length: 9.88 mi (15.90 km)
- Existed: 1991–present

Major junctions
- West end: Wenberg County Park in Lake Goodwin
- I-5 in Marysville
- East end: SR 9 in Arlington

Location
- Country: United States
- State: Washington
- County: Snohomish

Highway system
- State highways in Washington; Interstate; US; State; Scenic; Pre-1964; 1964 renumbering; Former
← SR 530	→ SR 532

State Route 531 (SR 531) is a short state highway in Snohomish County, Washington, United States. It runs from west to east along 172nd Street between Wenberg County Park on Lake Goodwin to a junction with SR 9 in southern Arlington, with an intermediate interchange with Interstate 5 (I-5) in Smokey Point. The highway is the primary access point for the Arlington Municipal Airport and the Smokey Point retail corridor.

SR 531 was created by the state legislature in 1991, using existing roads that were built in the early 20th century. Retail and housing development in the Smokey Point area triggered several expansion projects in the 1990s and 2000s to accommodate growing traffic volumes. The I-5 interchange was rebuilt and expanded between 2004 and 2010, including the addition of a loop ramp and a wider overpass. Its eastern terminus at SR 9 was converted into a roundabout in 2012.

== Route description ==
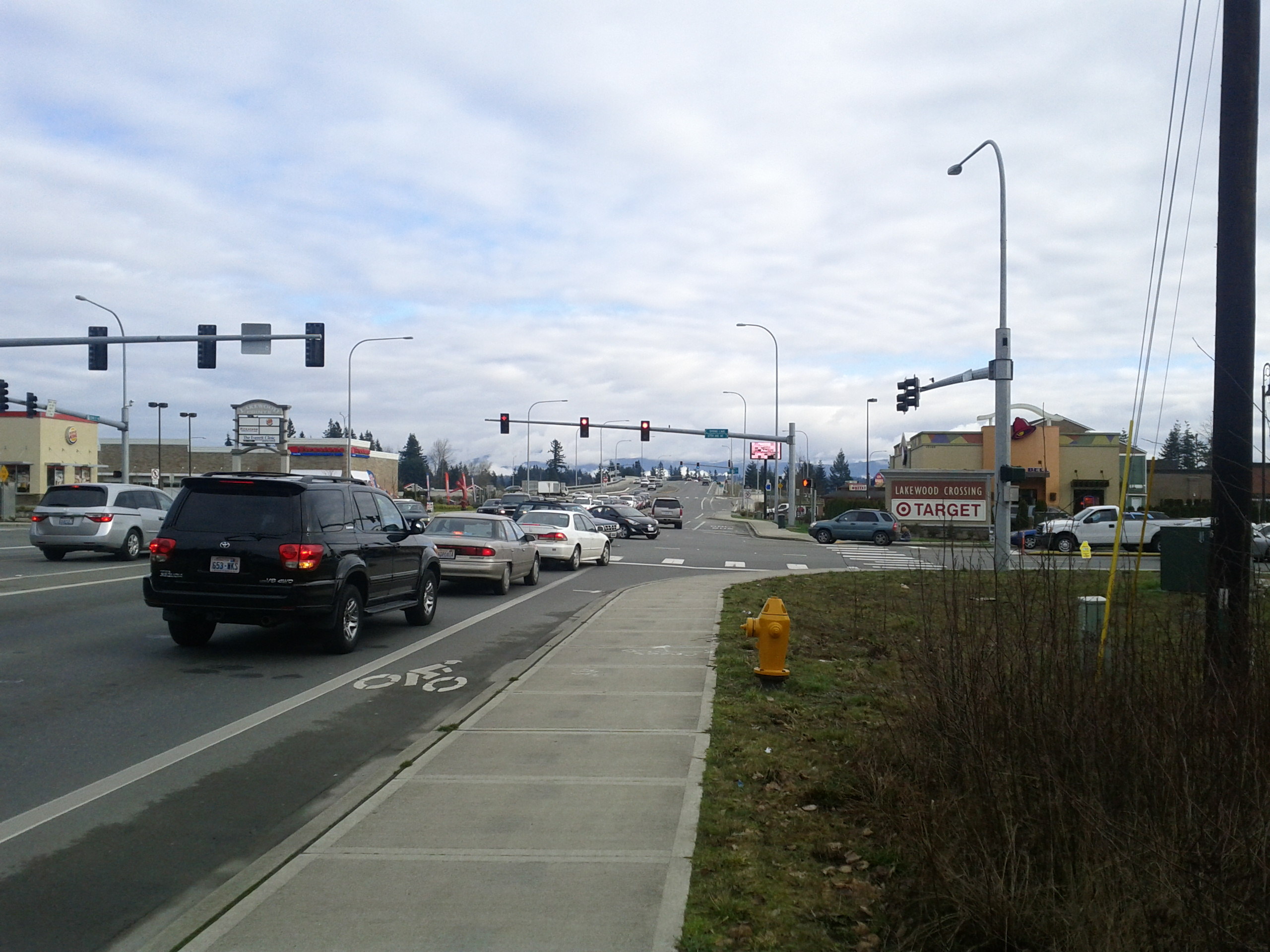
SR 531 eastbound at 27th Avenue, approaching the I-5 interchange

SR 531 begins at the entrance to Wenberg County Park, a former state park located on Lake Goodwin. The highway travels north on a section of East Lake Goodwin Road, which continues around the south and west sides of the lake. At the north end of the lake, SR 531 turns east onto Lakewood Road, a rural two-lane highway that passes several suburban subdivisions. The highway wraps around the north end of Lake Ki and Cougar Creek and turns due east onto 172nd Street Northeast at an intersection with Forty Five Road. It continues across the rural community of North Lakewood, passing the Lakewood High School campus.

The highway travels east over a set of railroad tracks into the city of Marysville, where it expands into a multi-lane road with sidewalks, bus pullouts, landscaping, a roundabout, and marked bicycle lanes. SR 531 passes several big-box retailers and apartment complexes before reaching a partial cloverleaf interchange with I-5, which marks the boundary between Marysville and Arlington. The overpass carrying SR 531 over I-5 is named the Oliver "Punks" Smith Bridge after a retired Arlington city councilmember who led calls for its reconstruction. The highway continues east into Arlington's Smokey Point neighborhood, passing several strip malls, a bus station, and government offices.

In eastern Smokey Point, SR 531 travels through a roundabout and returns to its two-lane configuration as it passes an Amazon distribution center. It then passes through a light industrial area that surrounds the Arlington Municipal Airport, which lies immediately to the north. The airport's main runway lies directly north of the highway, with low-flying planes making their final approach over SR 531, and the complex is ringed by a gravel multiuse trail. The highway crosses another set of railroad tracks and the Centennial Trail at 67th Avenue, which continues into downtown Arlington. From the crossing, SR 531 begins its ascent up a hill, curving to the north along the edge of the Gleneagle housing development and golf course. The highway terminates at a roundabout with SR 9 near a gun range south of downtown Arlington.

SR 531 is maintained by the Washington State Department of Transportation (WSDOT), which conducts an annual survey on the state's highways to measure traffic volume in terms of annual average daily traffic. In 2016, WSDOT calculated that the busiest section of the highway is located in Smokey Point and carried an average of 24,000 vehicles per day. The least traveled section was near Wenberg County Park and carried only 1,900 vehicles. A short section of SR 531 between I-5 and Smokey Point Boulevard is designated as a minor route of the National Highway System.

== History ==
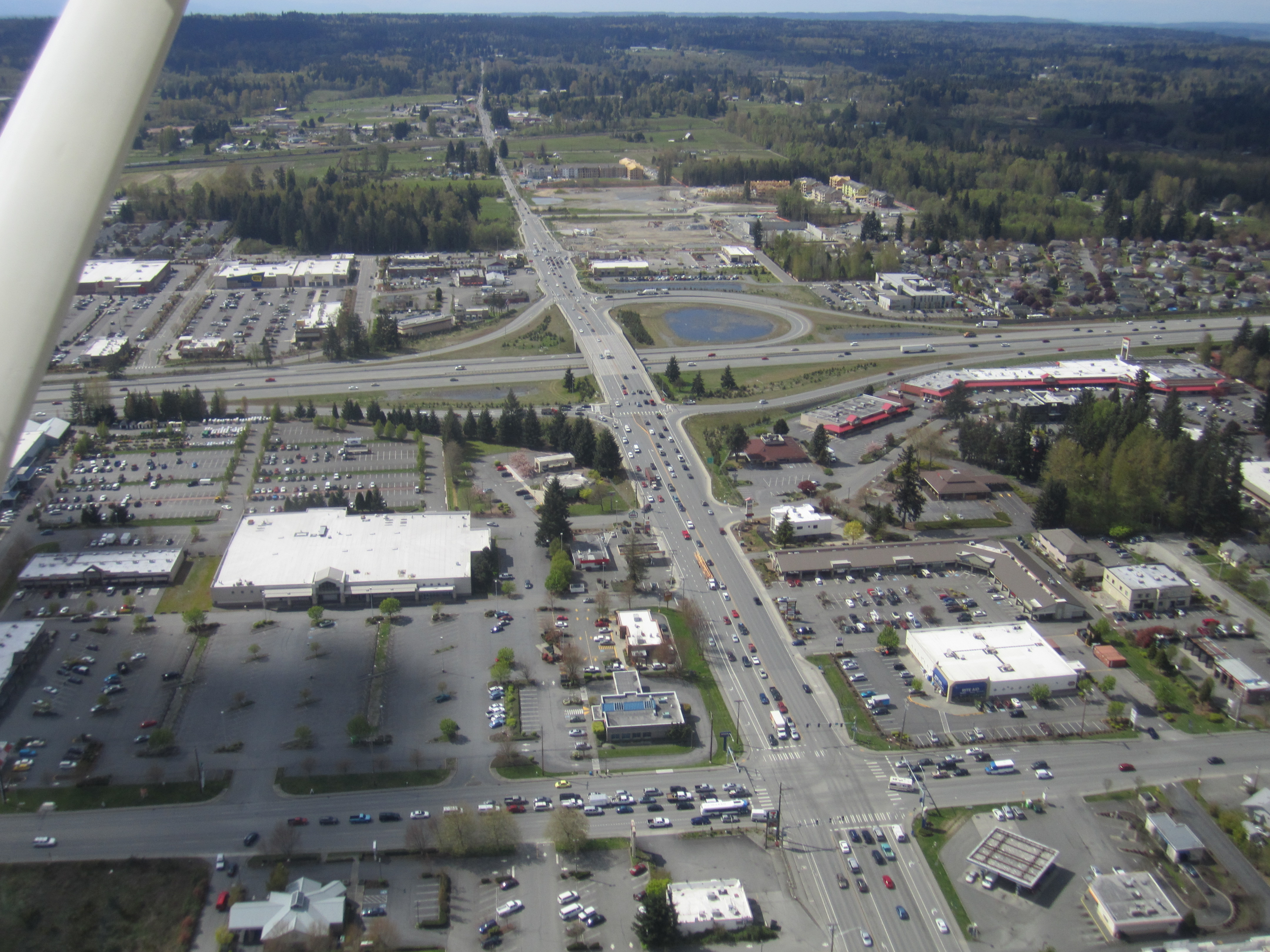
Aerial view of the I-5 interchange in Smokey Point, rebuilt in stages between 2004 and 2011

Lakewood and its adjoining community of English were established in 1908 along an unpaved road to Arlington, which later became part of SR 531. The road once extended east from Portage Creek to the banks of the South Fork Stillaguamish River, but this section was removed from maps by 1940. As retailers moved into the Smokey Point area, sections of the road were widened and improved in the 1980s with contributions from private developers.

SR 531 was designated as a state highway during the 1991 legislative session, but it was not transferred to state control until April 1, 1992. WSDOT identified the highway's two-lane overpass over I-5 as a candidate for replacement using state funding, but the project was pushed back several times in the 1990s. After it was removed from the preliminary list of projects under the Nickel Program in January 2003, a citizens group was formed to lobby elected officials for the interchange replacement. By the end of the year, the group had successfully negotiated for $6.5 million in funds (equivalent to $10.9 million in 2025 dollars) to replace the overpass and plan for a future interchange replacement, sourced from various state and local jurisdictions. The project's budget was later increased to $9.2 million (equivalent to $15 million in 2025 dollars) using federal funds obtained by the state's congressional delegation.

Construction of the new I-5 overpass began in August 2004 and was completed in December 2005, expanding the highway to six lanes and adding bicycle lanes and sidewalks. The old overpass, which had been built in 1968, was demolished in May 2005 after the completion of the new bridge's northern side. The new bridge opened in time to serve a new shopping center on the southwest side of the interchange, which contributed to an increase in traffic and collisions. The second phase of the project, a loop ramp channeling westbound traffic onto southbound I-5, began construction in March 2009 and was opened on August 28, 2009, six months ahead of schedule. The rest of the interchange project, including ramp meters and improved intersections, was completed in July 2010. The project's total budget was $33 million (equivalent to $47.5 million in 2025 dollars), but only cost $23.5 million to construct (equivalent to $33.8 million in 2025 dollars) due to cost savings in engineering and project bidding.

The Nickel Program also funded several other projects on the SR 531 that were completed in the late 2000s and early 2010s. In 2007, a set of sidewalks were added to the highway near Lakewood High School and its adjacent elementary school in Lakewood. A roundabout at SR 9 was opened to traffic in November 2012, replacing a signalized intersection that had been the site of frequent collisions. A second roundabout was added at 23rd Avenue west of the I-5 interchange, using funds from a private developer to support their new shopping center and apartment complex.

In the late 2000s, WSDOT also studied $57 million in traffic and safety improvements for the SR 531 corridor near the Arlington Municipal Airport, recommending that the highway be widened to four lanes and include bicycle lanes, sidewalks, and roundabouts at several intersections. Funding for the project was part of the Roads and Transit ballot measure in 2007, but the program was rejected by voters. In 2015, the state legislature allocated $39.3 million from the statewide transportation package to fund a widening project that is scheduled to be completed by 2026. Due to the anticipated increase in traffic caused by new industrial development in the area, a set of parallel reliever roads are also planned to be constructed in Smokey Point. A roundabout at 43rd Avenue Northeast and hard median in Smokey Point were completed by October 2022.

== Major intersections ==
The entire highway is in Snohomish County.

Location	mi	km	Destinations	Notes
Wenberg County Park	0.00	0.00	Park entrance	
Marysville–Arlington line	6.36	10.24	I-5 – Seattle, Vancouver, BC	
Arlington	6.63	10.67	Smokey Point Boulevard	Former US 99
Arlington	9.88	15.90	SR 9 – Arlington, Lake Stevens	Roundabout
1.000 mi = 1.609 km; 1.000 km = 0.621 mi
