= North Lakewood, Washington =

- neighborhood
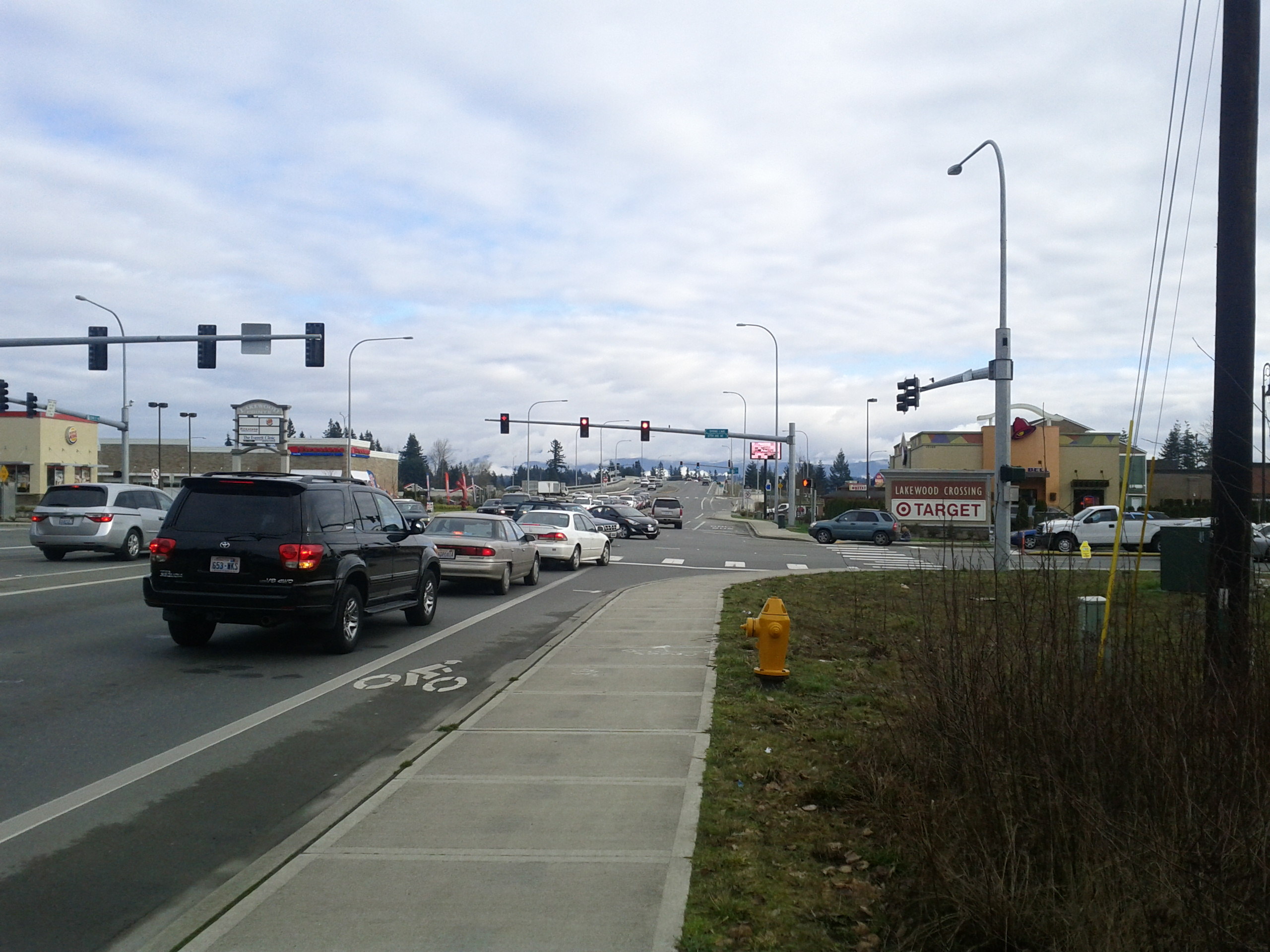
- Streets in North Lakewood

- Location of North Lakewood, Washington
- Coordinates: 48.151948°N 122.208087°W
- Country: United States
- State: Washington
- County: Snohomish
- Time zone: UTC-8 (Pacific (PST))
  - Summer (DST): UTC-7 (PDT)
- ZIP codes: 98223, 98258, 98271
- Area code: 360
- FIPS code: 53-37287
- GNIS feature ID: 1867616

North Lakewood is a neighborhood in Snohomish County, Washington, United States. It is located west of Arlington, east of Lake Goodwin, and north of the Tulalip Indian Reservation. North Lakewood is considered part of greater Smokey Point.

== History ==
Called "Lakewood" since the turn of the 20th century, the name was changed after the Pierce County community of the same name incorporated into the City of Lakewood in 1996. This soon created confusion with mail service, as there were now two communities sharing the name. To alleviate this problem, in 1998 the United States Postal Service granted the Pierce County community the rights to use "Lakewood, Washington", since it was now an incorporated city, and changed the Snohomish County community's name to "North Lakewood", which was unincorporated at the time. This allowed the Snohomish County community to keep its post office. Since 2005, the portion of North Lakewood located inside the urban growth boundary has been part of the City of Marysville.

== Education ==
The Lakewood School District serves the North Lakewood community. Schools include Lakewood High School, Lakewood Middle School, Lakewood Elementary, English Crossing Elementary, and Cougar Creek Elementary.

== Infrastructure ==
North Lakewood has one major road, Lakewood Road, which is also called 172nd Street and State Route 531. Interstate 5 is on the community's eastern boundary.
