= Northwest Regional Learning Center =

Coordinates: 48.1531°N 122.1701°W

Northwest Regional Learning Center (NRLC) is an alternative secondary school for disenfranchised and adjudicated young people. It was formerly located in Everett, Washington and hosted by the Snohomish County Juvenile Rehabilitation Administration. The school moved to Shoreline in the 2009–10 school year and shared a property with the Snohomish Discovery School program. The 2010–11 school year prompted another move from Shoreline back to Everett to a former Boeing classroom building. In 2011, NRLC was welcomed into the northern wing of the Weston High School campus, located in Arlington, WA.

Northwest Regional Learning Center is administered by the Northwest Educational School District 189 (ESD189), located in Anacortes. The ESD189 provides services to Western Washington school districts on a contract basis, depending on their needs. In this case, NRLC is a service provided to Snohomish County school districts in Washington State.

The student population is small, numbering most often under 40 students. In the 2025 - 2026 school year, the NRLC had 21 student slots. The school includes a Social Studies Department, a Science and Math Department, an Independent Studies wing, an integrated Language Arts curriculum, and a dedicated Special Education department. Students are able to earn credits towards their high school diploma, prepare for the GED, and improve academic and behavioral skills to transition back to their home school or into the community.

Most classes are under 15 students, and each class is staffed with one teacher and one instructional assistant to provide for better individualized instruction to meet the needs of each student.

== Participating Washington State School Districts ==
- Anacortes
- Arlington
- Concrete
- Edmonds
- Everett
- Granite Falls
- La Conner
- Lake Stevens
- Lakewood
- Marysville
- Mount Vernon
- Mukilteo
- Sedro-Woolley
- Snohomish
- Standwood-Camano
