= University of Washington North Sound =

Discontinued branch proposal for the University of Washington

- Motto: Lux sit (Latin for "Let there be light")
- Type: Discontinued proposal
- Location: Washington, U.S.
- Colors: Purple and gold

The University of Washington North Sound was a discontinued branch campus establishment proposal for the University of Washington. The sites had to be north of Lynnwood and south of Arlington, and have good transportation access (major freeway, transportation hub, etc.). The two proposed sites were in Smokey Point and in Everett. The plan had been for a 4-year college with an emphasis in math, science, engineering and technology.

In March 2008, Randy Hodgins, University of Washington spokesman, announced that "it's not happening this year at all" due to disagreements in location and funding. In September 2008, the Washington State Higher Education Coordinating Board retained the services of Bill Wilkerson to carry out their consensus-building task for a North Sound campus location, but was unsuccessful. "The short story about the consensus effort is there is not a consensus", summed up the panel chairman, Rep. Derek Kilmer, D-Gig Harbor. There has been no progress since winter of 2009.

== Proposed sites ==
There were four finalist sites that were judged more favorable than up to 80 other sites. Two finalists have since been disqualified.

=== Possible locations ===
==== Everett Station ====
A new campus may be located at Everett Station. The total acres available for the development are contentious. According to the CBRE Richard Ellis report conducted for NBBJ, 25.2 acres (102,000 m^{2}) were submitted by the City of Everett in their original proposal. Of this, 3.84 acres (15,500 m^{2}) are owned by Sound Transit and have been subsequently removed from the proposal, which leaves as little as 21.36 acres (86,400 m^{2}) of parcels available for consideration. This acreage does not include right-of-ways for public roads that currently exist. It is small compared to the two other sites, but it is near a transportation hub with Community Transit's SWIFT Bus Rapid Transit service coming soon along with Sound Transit's Link light rail service in Snohomish County. Everett also operates the north end of Sound Transit's Sounder commuter rail service to and from Seattle and then to Tacoma, Amtrak service to and from Vancouver (via Amtrak Cascades/Pacific Central Station and Seattle, and using Amtrak's Empire Builder, Everett has connections to Spokane and Chicago. It was rated the best site and the Snohomish County Council supports it.

The site along with the other Everett site has portions that are contaminated.

==== North Marysville ====
The North Marysville site is the most northerly and largest site. Its land is shared by the cities of Marysville and Arlington. It is 394 acres (1.59 km^{2}) large and is located between Smokey Pt. Blvd. (west), 51st Ave. (east), 156th St. (south), and 160th St. (north). Legislators from North of Everett have indicated that this location would be their preference.

The closest school district to the site and the surrounding community of Smokey Pt. is the Lakewood School District.

=== Disqualified locations ===
==== Everett Kimberly-Clark/Snohomish River ====
The Kimberly-Clark/Snohomish River site was purchased in 2005 by The City of Everett from Kimberly-Clark. It was an industrial area about 90 acres (360,000 m^{2}) large and is partially contaminated. It is located along the Snohomish River, east of I-5, and north of US 2. The only road is Grand Avenue, which becomes Everett Avenue (SR 529) and interchanges with I-5 and US 2. This site is the lowest-rated site according to a survey by the University of Washington.

==== Lake Stevens/Cavalero Corner ====
The Lake Stevens/Cavalero Corner site is the eastern site. It has a more central location for Snohomish County. It is slightly larger than the Kimberly-Clark site, roughly 98 acres (400,000 m^{2}). It is also located along US 2.

== Future ==
Due to the state's significant budget shortfall, plans for a new campus have been delayed indefinitely. There are also concerns by several state legislators that such a campus may not be necessary due to the recent growth of UW's Bothell campus and Bellevue College becoming a new four-year college.
