= Lakewood High School (Washington) =

- The front entrance of the high school, seen in 2022

Location
- 17023 11th Ave NE; Arlington, Washington 98223; United States; 48°09′04″N 122°12′49″W

Information
- School type: Public, High school
- Motto: Inspiring Growth. Empowering Futures.
- Established: 1983; 43 years ago
- School district: Lakewood School District
- CEEB code: 480586
- NCES School ID: 530426002117
- Principal: Jeanette Grisham
- Teaching staff: 34.70 (FTE)
- Grades: 9-12
- Enrollment: 834 (2024-2025)
- Student to teacher ratio: 24.03
- Campus type: Rural
- Colors: Maroon & Gold
- Mascot: Cougars
- Information: (360) 652-4505
- Website: Lakewood High School homepage

Lakewood High School (commonly known as Lakewood or LHS) is a public secondary school in what was Arlington, but annexed to become an addition of Marysville, Washington, serving students in grades 9–12. The school is the only secondary school in the Lakewood School District, serving the Lake Goodwin, North Lakewood, and Smokey Point areas.

The original high school was built in 1983 and expanded in later years to accommodate a growing school population. A $66.8 million bond measure was passed in April 2014 to design and build a new high school on the same campus, with a capacity of 825 students. Construction began in May 2016. The new two-story, 160,000 square feet (15,000 m^{2}) building opened in September 2017 while demolition of the old building was still in progress.

== Sports ==
The Lakewood Cougars compete in the 2A Northwest Conference. Sports offered: Baseball, Basketball, Cheer, Cross Country, Football, Flag Football, Golf, Soccer, Softball, Tennis, Track & Field, Volleyball, Wrestling, Unified Basketball, Unified Soccer.

=== State Championships ===
Lakewood has won 4 WIAA state titles:

State Titles
| Year | Sport | Classification |
|---|---|---|
| 1994 | Girls' Cross Country | A |
| 1993 | Girls' Cross Country | A |
| 1991 | Girls' Cross Country | A |
| 1989 | Boys' Cross Country | A |

== Alumni ==
Kataka Corn (2018), Actor and Musician
