= Karla Wilson =

Washington State politician

Member of the Washington House of Representatives from the 39th district
- In office January 14, 1985 – January 14, 1991
- Preceded by: James B. Mitchell
- Succeeded by: John Wynne

Personal details
- Born: November 16, 1934 Washington, U.S.
- Died: December 31, 2022 (aged 88)
- Party: Democratic
- Education: University of Washington (B.A., M.A.)
- Occupation: Teacher

Karla Wilson (November 16, 1934 – December 31, 2022) was an American politician who served as a member of the Washington House of Representatives from 1985 to 1991.

== Career ==
A lifelong resident of Lake Stevens, Washington, she represented Washington legislative district 39A as a Democrat. She studied at Vassar College in New York and earned a Bachelor of Arts in English/Education and a Master of Arts in special education, both from the University of Washington. Wilson later taught at Lake Stevens High School and was a Running Start administrator at Everett Community College.

== Personal life ==
Wilson had three daughters and raised several foster children with her husband Bill Wilson. She died at the age of 88 at a nursing home in East Wenatchee, Washington, on December 31, 2022.
