= Washington State Route 204 =

Highway in Washington

State Route 204
- SR 204 highlighted in red

Route information
- Auxiliary route of US 2
- Maintained by WSDOT
- Length: 2.38 mi (3.83 km)
- Existed: 1964–present

Major junctions
- West end: US 2 near Everett
- East end: SR 9 in Lake Stevens

Location
- Country: United States
- State: Washington
- County: Snohomish

Highway system
- State highways in Washington; Interstate; US; State; Scenic; Pre-1964; 1964 renumbering; Former
← SR 203	→ I-205

State Route 204 (SR 204) is a short state highway in Snohomish County, Washington, United States. It connects U.S. Route 2 (US 2) at the eastern end of the Hewitt Avenue Trestle to the city of Lake Stevens, terminating at a junction with SR 9. The highway runs for a total length of 2.4 miles (3.9 km) and passes through several suburban neighborhoods.

The Everett–Lake Stevens road was originally added to the state highway system in 1937 as part of Secondary State Highway 15A (SSH 15A), which continued northeasterly to Granite Falls. The modern highway was built in 1954 and designated as SR 204 a decade later during the 1964 state highway renumbering, while the eastern half of SSH 15A became SR 92. Since then, suburban development in the area has necessitated planning for the reconstruction of the SR 9 intersection into a full interchange.

== Route description ==
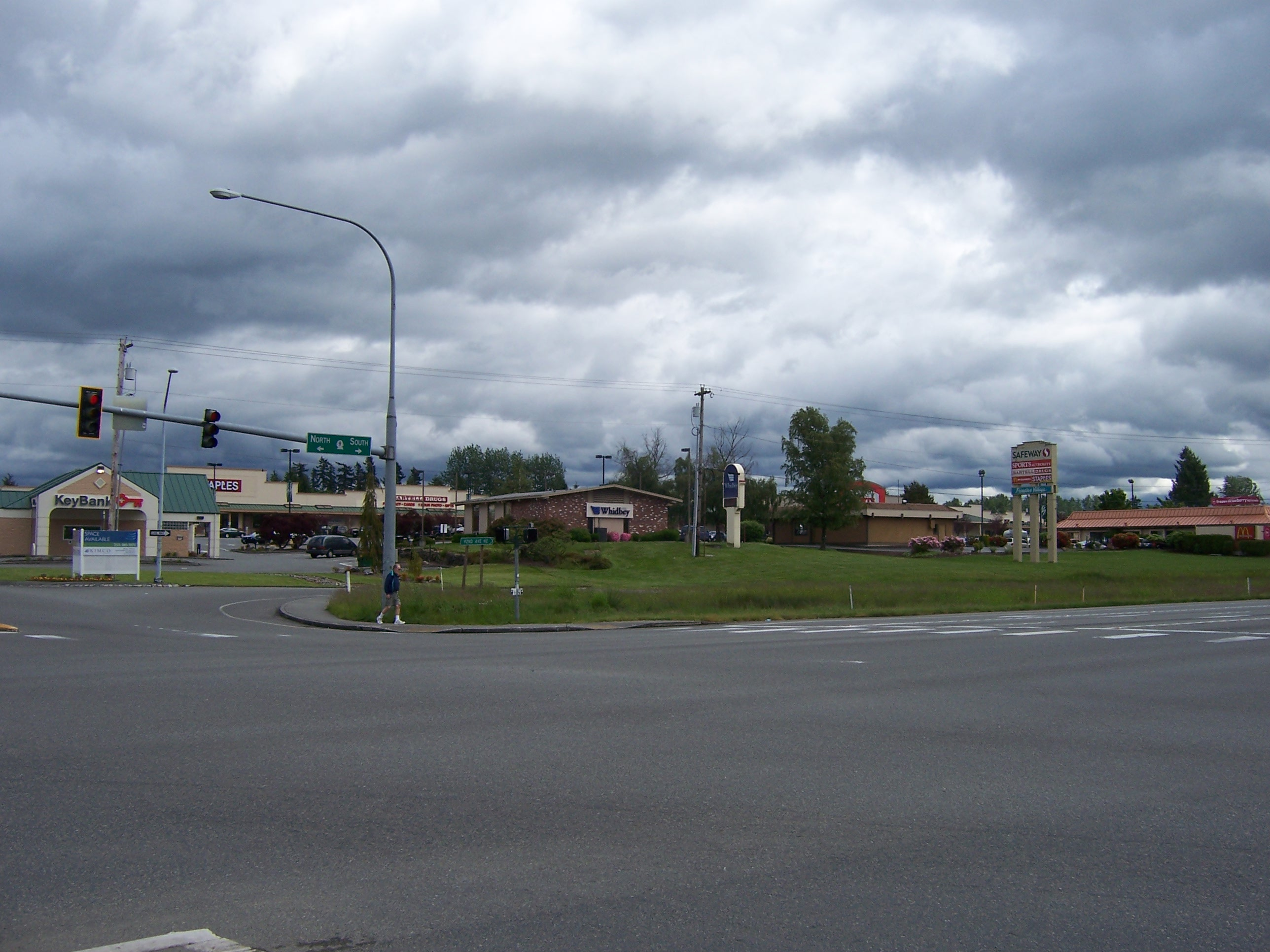
The highway's eastern terminus, a junction with SR 9 at Frontier Village in Lake Stevens

SR 204 begins in Cavalero Corner at an interchange with US 2 at the east end of the Hewitt Avenue Trestle, which crosses Ebey Island and connects the highway to Everett. The interchange has direct ramps connecting SR 204 to westbound US 2 and an intersection for traffic heading east on 20th Street Southeast and southeast on US 2 towards Snohomish. The highway ascends from the Snohomish River estuary and runs northeasterly along the edge of several suburban neighborhoods before entering the city of Lake Stevens. SR 204 has few intersections with cross streets and is primarily a three-lane road with one westbound lane and two eastbound lanes. After crossing under a set of transmission lines near Market Place, the highway widens to four lanes and enters the Frontier Village commercial district. SR 204 terminates in the center of the district at a junction with SR 9, which continues north to Arlington and south to Snohomish.

SR 204 is maintained by the Washington State Department of Transportation (WSDOT), which conducts an annual survey on state highways to measure traffic volume in terms of annual average daily traffic. Average traffic volumes on the highway in 2016 ranged from a minimum of 5,800 vehicles at its interchange with US 2 to a maximum of 38,000 after the interchange. A section west of Frontier Village had an average volume of 21,000 vehicles in 2016. The entire route is also designated as a MAP-21 principal arterial route under the National Highway System.

== History ==
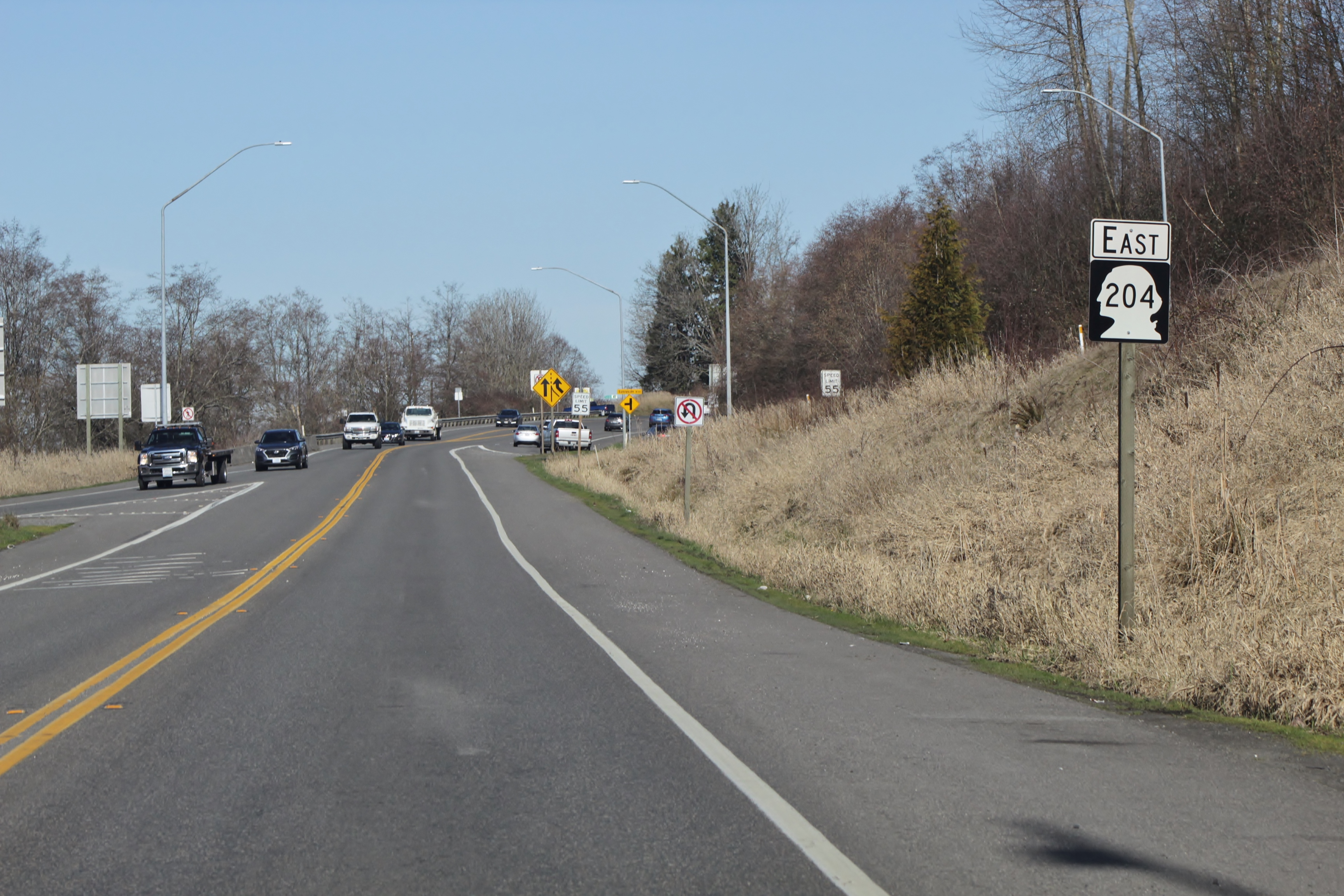
Looking eastbound on SR 204 from its western terminus

The original route of the Pacific Highway between Everett and the rest of northwestern Washington ran across Ebey Island and turned north onto Sunnyside Boulevard at Cavalero Corner before continuing into Marysville. Vernon Road, constructed in the 1910s and paved in 1916, branched off from Sunnyside Boulevard at the bottom of Cavalero Hill and traveled northeasterly along the shore of Lake Stevens to the settlement of Hartford. The Pacific Highway was moved in the late 1920s to a more direct route traversing set of new bridges across the Snohomish River estuary, while the Ebey Island road itself was replaced by the completed Hewitt Avenue Trestle in 1936.

Vernon Road was added to the reformed state highway system in 1937 as part of Secondary State Highway 15A (SSH 15A), connecting Primary State Highway 15 (PSH 15) with SSH 1A in Lake Stevens and the city of Granite Falls. SSH 15A was moved onto a new highway bypassing Vernon Road in 1954, ahead of work to rebuild the interchange with PSH 15 (by then part of US 2). During the state legislature's 1964 renumbering of the state highway system, SSH 15A was split into two routes: SR 204 from Cavalero Corner to SSH 1A; and SR 92 from northwestern Lake Stevens to Granite Falls. SSH 1A was renumbered to SR 9, which had been relocated in the 1950s to a new road that cut through the Frontier Village commercial district. The current interchange at Cavalero Corner between US 2 and SR 204 was opened in October 1967 as part of the expansion of the Hewitt Avenue Trestle that was completed two years later.

Major suburban development in the Lake Stevens area began in the 1980s, bringing increased traffic on SR 204 and the Hewitt Avenue Trestle. An eastbound truck climbing lane was installed on the highway in 1988. An expansion of the US 2 interchange was completed in 1993, including an onramp from eastbound US 2 to eastbound SR 204, as part of a $100 million project to replace the Hewitt Avenue Trestle. The highway's intersection with Market Place in Frontier Village was reconstructed in 2004 as part of several city-funded improvements in the area.

The state legislature's 2015 Connecting Washington budget and 2016 supplementary budget funded two studies into potential improvements to both termini on SR 204 to address traffic congestion. The Frontier Village junction with SR 9 was planned to be rebuilt as a diamond interchange, with an overpass for SR 204, that was estimated to cost $69.5 million. In early 2019, WSDOT announced that it would re-examine an earlier concept to use roundabouts to manage the intersection at a lower cost compared to the chosen interchange option. The agency had begun subsurface investigations and discovered shallow groundwater that would impede construction of the SR 9 underpass. Another earlier concept had suggested the addition of grade-separated ramps to the current intersection. A separate study into rebuilding the US 2 interchange was completed in 2018 and recommended reconfiguration of its ramps to eliminate the current one-lane merge. The project's four roundabouts near Frontier Village were constructed in a year and fully opened in July 2023. The number of collisions at the four intersections increased from 43 in 2022 to 92 from January to April 2024, but their severity was lessened.

== Major intersections ==
The entire route is in Snohomish County.

Location	mi	km	Destinations	Notes
	0.00	0.00	US 2 / 20th Street Southeast – Everett, Wenatchee	
Lake Stevens	2.38	3.83	SR 9 / Vernon Road – Lake Stevens, Granite Falls, Snohomish	
1.000 mi = 1.609 km; 1.000 km = 0.621 mi
