= Wenberg County Park =

County park in Washington state, US

- Location within the United States
- Location: Lake Goodwin, Snohomish County, Washington, United States
- Coordinates: 48.136738°N 122.285857°W
- Area: 46 acres (18.6 ha)
- Governing body: Snohomish County, Washington

Wenberg County Park, formerly Wenberg State Park, is a 46-acre (18.6 ha) park located on the shores of Lake Goodwin in the community of Lake Goodwin, Washington. The park is maintained by Snohomish County Parks and Recreation and includes a public beach for swimming, a boat launch, cabins, picnic shelters, and campgrounds. It is located at the western terminus of State Route 531. The county charges $10 for some activities.

The park is named for East Stanwood postmaster Marie Louise Wenberg, who led a fundraising effort that raised $1,500 to purchase 20 acres (8.1 ha) of waterfront property from C. D. Hillman for a public park. The campaign was spurred by reports that a golf course was proposed to be constructed at the property by businessmen from Everett. Wenberg Park was dedicated in 1939 and remained under county ownership until it was acquired by the state government in 1947. It remained a Washington state park until July 16, 2009, when the state transferred the park back to Snohomish County in an effort to keep it open while addressing a state budget crisis. The park underwent $3 million in renovations in 2018 to improve access to the beach and boat launch area.
