= Lakewood Elementary School =

Lakewood Elementary School may refer to:

== Canada ==
- Lakewood Elementary School in Langford, British Columbia

== United States ==
- Lakewood School in Lakewood, California
- Lakewood Elementary School in Lodi, California
- Lakewood Elementary School in Modesto, California
- Lakewood Elementary School in Sunnyvale, California
- Lakewood Elementary School in unincorporated Hardin County, Kentucky
- Lakewood Elementary School in Rockville, Maryland
- Lakewood Elementary School in Ann Arbor, Michigan
- Lakewood Elementary School in unincorporated Oakland County, Michigan
- Lakewood Elementary (DPS) School in Durham, North Carolina
- Lakewood Elementary School in Surfside Beach, South Carolina
- Lakewood Elementary School (Dallas, Texas)
- Lakewood Elementary School (Euless), Texas
- Lakewood Elementary School in unincorporated Harris County, Texas
- Lakewood Elementary School in Houston, Texas
- Lakewood Elementary School in Temple, Texas
- Lakewood Elementary School (Washington) in Marysville, Washington
- Lakewood Elementary School in Luling, Louisiana

== In fiction ==
- Lakewood Elementary School, a fictional school in the American-Canadian children's television series Arthur
