= West Lake Stevens, Washington =

- former CDP
- Location of West Lake Stevens, Washington
- Coordinates: 47°59′45″N 122°6′7″W
- Country: United States
- State: Washington
- County: Snohomish

Area
  - Total: 11.3 sq mi (29.2 km^{2})
  - Land: 9.7 sq mi (25.1 km^{2})
  - Water: 1.6 sq mi (4.1 km^{2})
- Elevation: 367 ft (112 m)

Population (2000)
  - Total: 18,071
  - Density: 1,867/sq mi (720.7/km^{2})
- Time zone: UTC-8 (Pacific (PST))
  - Summer (DST): UTC-7 (PDT)
- FIPS code: 53-77542
- GNIS feature ID: 1867643

West Lake Stevens is a former census-designated place (CDP) in Snohomish County, Washington, United States. The population was 18,071 at the 2000 census.

Much of West Lake Stevens was annexed into the City of Lake Stevens through a community-driven effort called "One Community Around the Lake" that began in 2006. The remaining parts were taken to form the new CDPs of Bunk Foss and Cavalero in 2010.

== Geography ==
West Lake Stevens is located at 47°59′45″N 122°6′7″W (47.995925, -122.101815).

According to the United States Census Bureau, the CDP had a total area of 11.3 square miles (29.2 km^{2}), of which, 9.7 square miles (25.1 km^{2}) of it is land and 1.6 square miles (4.1 km^{2}) of it (14.11%) is water.

== Demographics ==
As of the census of 2000, there were 18,071 people, 6,255 households, and 4,828 families residing in the CDP. The population density was 1,866.5 people per square mile (720.8/km^{2}). There were 6,504 housing units at an average density of 671.8/sq mi (259.4/km^{2}). The racial makeup of the CDP was 91.01% White, 1.03% African American, 0.84% Native American, 1.96% Asian, 0.17% Pacific Islander, 1.74% from other races, and 3.25% from two or more races. Hispanic or Latino of any race were 4.39% of the population.

There were 6,255 households, out of which 47.0% had children under the age of 18 living with them, 61.2% were married couples living together, 11.0% had a female householder with no husband present, and 22.8% were non-families. 16.4% of all households were made up of individuals, and 4.3% had someone living alone who was 65 years of age or older. The average household size was 2.89 and the average family size was 3.23.

In the CDP, the age distribution of the population shows 32.3% under the age of 18, 7.1% from 18 to 24, 36.6% from 25 to 44, 17.7% from 45 to 64, and 6.3% who were 65 years of age or older. The median age was 31 years. For every 100 females, there were 99.6 males. For every 100 females age 18 and over, there were 98.7 males.

The median income for a household in the CDP was $57,331, and the median income for a family was $60,258. Males had a median income of $45,648 versus $31,061 for females. The per capita income for the CDP was $22,281. About 4.4% of families and 5.3% of the population were below the poverty line, including 5.5% of those under age 18 and 7.0% of those age 65 or over.
