= Lake Goodwin (Snohomish County, Washington) =

Lake in Snohomish County, Washington, United States

- Location within Washington (state) Location within the United States
- Location: Snohomish County, Washington
- Coordinates: 48°8′29.14″N 122°17′40.21″W
- Primary inflows: Lake Crabapple and Lake Loma
- Primary outflows: Lake Shoecraft
- Catchment area: 3,466 acres (1,403 ha)
- Basin countries: United States
- Surface area: 535 acres (217 ha)
- Average depth: 23 ft (7.0 m)
- Max. depth: 50 ft (15 m)
- Water volume: 13,000 acre⋅ft (0.02 km^{3})
- Shore length^{1}: 5.4 mi (8.7 km)
- Surface elevation: 328 ft (100 m)
- References: State of the Lakes Report
- ^{1} Shore length is not a well-defined measure.

Lake Goodwin is a lake in Snohomish County, Washington, United States. The surrounding census district of Lake Goodwin, Washington is named after the lake.

The lake is the largest and by far the most popular of the Seven Lakes area northwest of Marysville, Washington. Wenberg County Park is the main public access to the lake. In 1996, Snohomish County bought a formerly privately owned resort on the north tip of the lake, and is working on developing it into a park.
