= Bunk Foss, Washington =

- CDP
- Location of Bunk Foss, Washington.
- Coordinates: 47°57′42″N 122°5′40″W
- Country: United States
- State: Washington
- County: Snohomish

Area
  - Total: 3.87 sq mi (10.03 km^{2})
  - Land: 3.87 sq mi (10.03 km^{2})
  - Water: 0 sq mi (0.0 km^{2})

Population (2010)
  - Total: 3,570
  - Density: 922/sq mi (355.8/km^{2})
- Time zone: UTC-8 (Pacific (PST))
  - Summer (DST): UTC-7 (PDT)
- GNIS feature ID: 2584953

Bunk Foss is a census-designated place (CDP) in Snohomish County, Washington, United States. As of the 2020 census, Bunk Foss had a population of 3,680. Bunk Foss was created out of the former West Lake Stevens CDP in 2010.

== Geography ==
Bunk Foss is located at 47°57′42″N 122°5′40″W (47.961686, -122.094387).

According to the United States Census Bureau, the CDP has a total area of 3.874 square miles (10.03 km^{2}), all of it land.

== Demographics ==
Historical population
Census	Pop.	Note	%±
2010	3,570		—
2020	3,680		3.1%
U.S. Decennial Census; 2000 2010

Bunk Foss first appeared as a census designated place in the 2010 U.S. census formed from part of deleted West Lake Stevens CDP and additional area.

=== Racial and ethnic composition ===
Bunk Foss CDP, Washington – Racial and ethnic composition Note: the US Census treats Hispanic/Latino as an ethnic category. This table excludes Latinos from the racial categories and assigns them to a separate category. Hispanics/Latinos may be of any race.
Race / Ethnicity (NH = Non-Hispanic)	Pop 2010	Pop 2020	% 2010	% 2020
White alone (NH)	3,251	3,067	91.06%	83.34%
Black or African American alone (NH)	22	26	0.62%	0.71%
Native American or Alaska Native alone (NH)	20	10	0.56%	0.27%
Asian alone (NH)	37	71	1.04%	1.93%
Native Hawaiian or Pacific Islander alone (NH)	5	3	0.14%	0.08%
Other race alone (NH)	1	23	0.03%	0.63%
Mixed race or Multiracial (NH)	101	267	2.83%	7.26%
Hispanic or Latino (any race)	133	213	3.73%	5.79%
Total	3,570	3,680	100.00%	100.00%
