= Hewitt Avenue Trestle =

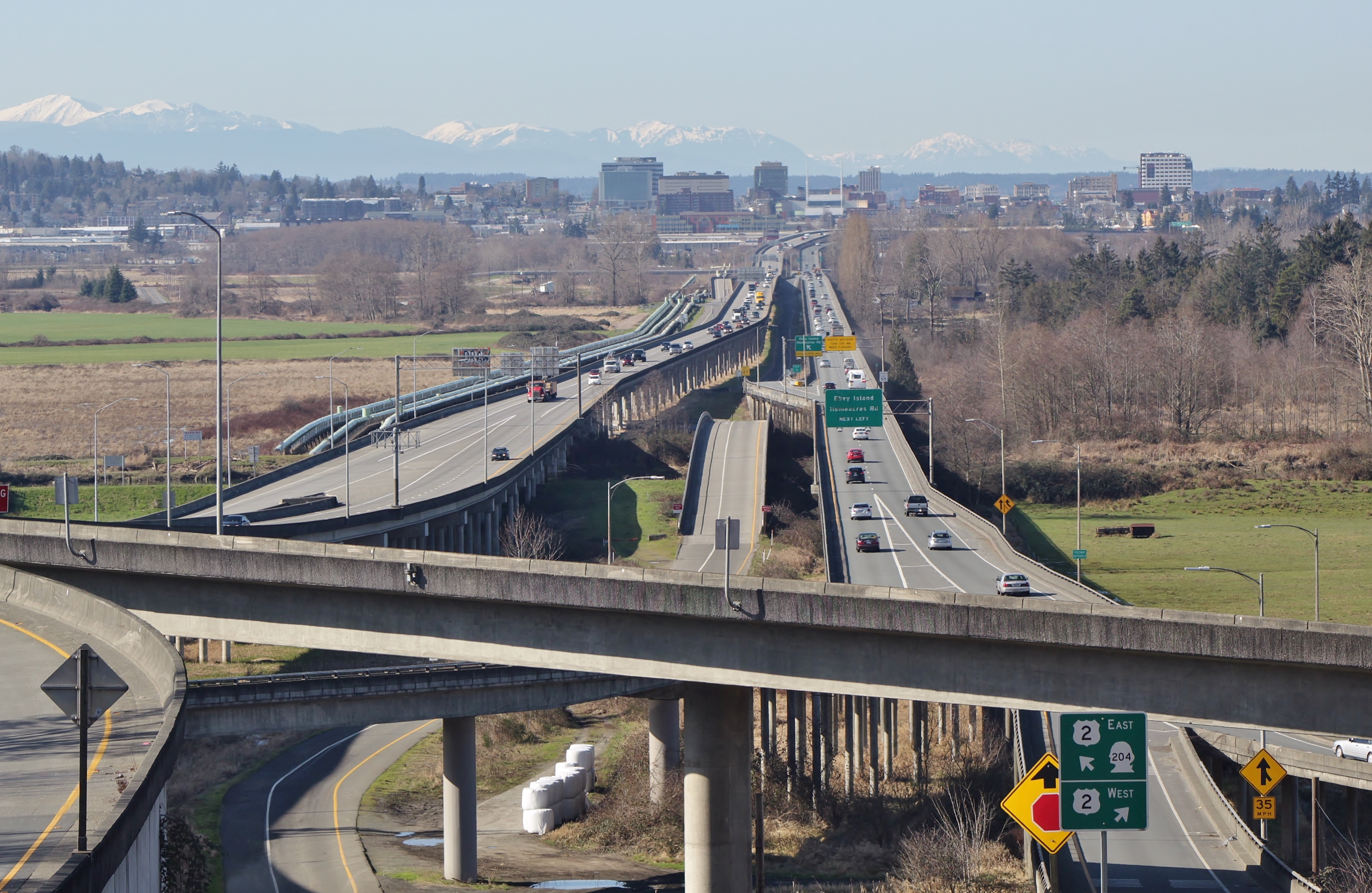
- View of the Hewitt Avenue Trestle from its east end
- Coordinates: 47.979°N 122.162°W
- Carries: U.S. Route 2
- Crosses: Ebey Slough
- Maintained by: Washington State Department of Transportation

Characteristics
- Material: Reinforced concrete
- Total length: 2.5 mi (4.0 km)
- No. of lanes: 4

History
- Construction cost: $100 million (1993 rebuild)
- Opened: 1936
- Rebuilt: 1968, 1993–2001

Location
- Interactive map of Hewitt Avenue Trestle

The Hewitt Avenue Trestle is a causeway carrying U.S. Route 2 from Everett to Lake Stevens. It crosses the Snohomish River, Ebey Island, and the Ebey Slough. The western end of the trestle is an interchange with Interstate 5, while the eastern end is an interchange with State Route 204 and 20th Street.

The original wooden and concrete trestle was opened on January 15, 1936, carrying both directions of traffic and including a drawbridge over the Snohomish River. It replaced an earlier bridge that was later removed. A parallel trestle to carry westbound traffic was partially opened on April 8, 1968, and fully opened with ceremonies on April 8, 1969, at a cost of $7.3 million. The trestle was converted into an expressway terminating at interchange with Interstate 5 and State Route 204.

The wooden trestle had deteriorated by the 1980s and necessitated a replacement. The narrow lane configuration and lack of a shoulder caused drivers to have anxiety attacks and contributed to hazardous driving conditions. A new 2.5-mile (4.0 km) eastbound trestle was built between 1991 and 2001 for $100 million, using reinforced concrete.

A Washington State Transportation Commission report in 2018 listed replacement plans for the westbound trestle with a new, three-lane trestle at costs ranging from $620 million to $2 billion with funding by various means including up to $690 million in tolls. The westbound trestle is a major traffic chokepoint for communities in eastern Snohomish County and is seismically vulnerable, with estimates of up to three years to replace the structure after a major earthquake.
