= Lake Stevens School District =

School district serving Lake Stevens, Washington, United States

Lake Stevens School District No. 4

Location
- Lake Stevens, Washington, United States; 48°01′03″N 122°03′52″W

Information
- Type: Public
- Superintendent: Ken Collins
- Grades: K–12

Lake Stevens School District No. 4 is a public school district that primarily serves the city of Lake Stevens, Washington, United States.

There are 7 elementary schools (grades kindergarten through 5th), 2 middle schools (grades 6th through 7th), 1 mid-high school (grades 8th and 9th), and 1 high school (grades 10th through 12th) in this district.

== Schools ==
=== High schools ===
- Lake Stevens High School

=== Mid-High School ===
- Cavelero Mid-High School

=== Middle schools ===
- Lake Stevens Middle School (LSMS)
- North Lake Middle School

=== Elementary schools ===
- Glenwood Elementary School
- Highland Elementary School
- Hillcrest Elementary School
- Mt. Pilchuck Elementary School
- Skyline Elementary School
- Sunnycrest Elementary School
- Stevens Creek Elementary School

=== Early Education ===
- The Early Learning Center

== Notable alumni ==
- Jacob Eason, professional American football player
- Chris Pratt, actor
- Ryan Verdugo, professional baseball player

== School board ==
- John Boerger - President
- Kevin Plemel - Vice President
- Paul Lund - Board Member
- Mari Taylor - Board Member
- David Iseminger - Board Member
- Ken Collins - Superintendent
