= Lakewood School District (Washington) =

School district in Washington, United States

Lakewood School District #306

Location
- North Lakewood, Washington Snohomish County United States
- Coordinates: 48.151285°N 122.208251°W

District information
- Type: Public
- Motto: Inspiring Growth. Empowering Futures.
- Grades: PK–12
- Established: 1914
- Superintendent: Dr. Erin Murphy
- Schools: 5
- Budget: $56 million
- NCES District ID: 5304260

Students and staff
- Students: Approximately 2,600
- Teachers: 151
- Student–teacher ratio: 16.5:1
- Athletic conference: WIAA Cascade Conference 2A
- District mascot: Cougar
- Colors: Maroon and Gold

Other information
- Website: www.lwsd.wednet.edu

Lakewood School District, officially known as Lakewood School District 306, is a school district that serves the communities of Lake Goodwin, North Lakewood, and Smokey Point in northern Snohomish County, Washington in the Pacific Northwest region of the United States. It consists of five schools, three of which are elementary schools and two are middle and high schools, respectively. The district was established in 1914 as consolidation of three earlier school districts in the region that were established as early as 1891. The majority of district facilities, including the main office, are located on a campus located south of Washington State Route 531 in North Lakewood. There are bus transportation services offered for most students who live within its 22.5-square-mile (58 km^{2}) area.

== History ==
Lakewood School District 306 was formed in 1914 by consolidating three smaller school districts formed between 1891 and 1909. School District 45, the oldest and largest district in the area, was formed on February 28, 1891, and served 40 students at English. School District 65 was formed on November 12, 1892, and served 30 students in the Lake Goodwin area. School District 102, the newest and smallest district in the area, was formed on September 25, 1909, and served 20 students in Smokey Point. The new district served 70 students from grades one to eleven in a three-story schoolhouse and sent its high school students to the nearby Arlington School District beginning in 1958. The schoolhouse was demolished in 1958 and students were moved to a new campus consisting of two wings and eight classrooms, later expanded to include a gymnasium and eleven classrooms by 1966. The campus was renovated into Lakewood Elementary School while older students were moved to an adjacent junior high school, now Lakewood Middle School, in 1972. The school district built its first high school, now Lakewood High School in 1983 and graduated its first senior class the following year. The school district re-organized its schools in 1988, converting Lakewood Elementary into Lakewood Primary School, serving grades K–3, and converting the junior high school into Lakewood Intermediate School, serving grades 4–6. A bond issue was passed in 1992 to fund the construction of English Crossing Elementary School, opened in 1995 serving grades 3–5. The primary school was renamed back to Lakewood Elementary and served grades K–2, while the intermediate school was converted back to Lakewood Middle School after an extensive remodeling, serving grades 6–8. Cougar Creek Elementary School was completed in 2003 to supplement the two other elementary schools by serving grades K–5. All three elementary schools were re-organized in 2011 to serve grades K–5 in all three schools, with Lakewood Elementary retaining its preschool program.

== Facilities ==
The Lakewood School District consists of five schools, three of which are elementary schools, one middle school, and one high school, located within North Lakewood. The three elementary schools, serving children from kindergarten to grade five, are: Cougar Creek Elementary School, which is home to 359 students, English Crossing Elementary School, which is home to 342 students, and Lakewood Elementary School, which is home to 365 students. Lakewood Middle School serves as the district's only middle school, serving 594 students from grades six to eight, while the district's only high school is Lakewood High School, which serves 759 students from grades nine to twelve.

Lakewood High	Lakewood Middle	Cougar Creek Elementary	English Crossing Elementary	Lakewood Elementary
1983–present	1972–present	2003–present	1995–present	1958–present
Grades 9–12	Grades 6–8	Grades K–5		

== Demographics ==
The Lakewood School District consists of five educational institutions: Lakewood High School, Lakewood Middle School, Cougar Creek Elementary School, English Crossing Elementary School, and Lakewood Elementary School. Lakewood High School maintains a 2.3 rank for math proficiency and 3.2 rank for reading comprehension, both near the Washington state average. A total of 2,666 students attend public schools in the district; over 1,200 of these students attend elementary schools, about 600 students attend Lakewood Middle School and more than 800 students attend Lakewood High School. 511 students have the Individualized Education Program disability and 222 are English-language learners.

There is a 20.75 student-teacher ratio, and the district uses over $27 million to help maintain its schools. Lakewood's superintendent is Dr. Erin Murphy. It covers an area of 22.5 square miles (58.27 km^{2}), with a population of people related to the district being 17,953 at the Census American Community Survey 2024, encompassing parts of Arlington, Lake Goodwin, Marysville, and Kayak Point. It also includes North Lakewood and Smokey Point. There is a population of 849.3 inhabitants per square mile (327.92/km^{2}) and a 29.5 percent diversity index, ranking fifth out of fourteen school districts in Snohomish County for diversity. The main office of the school district, used by the superintendent, is located at 17110 16th Drive Northeast in North Lakewood, adjacent to the city of Marysville, south of Washington State Route 531.

== See also ==
- List of school districts in Washington (state)
