= Lake Stevens High School =

Public high school in Lake Stevens, Washington, United States

Coordinates: 48°01′21″N 122°04′49″W

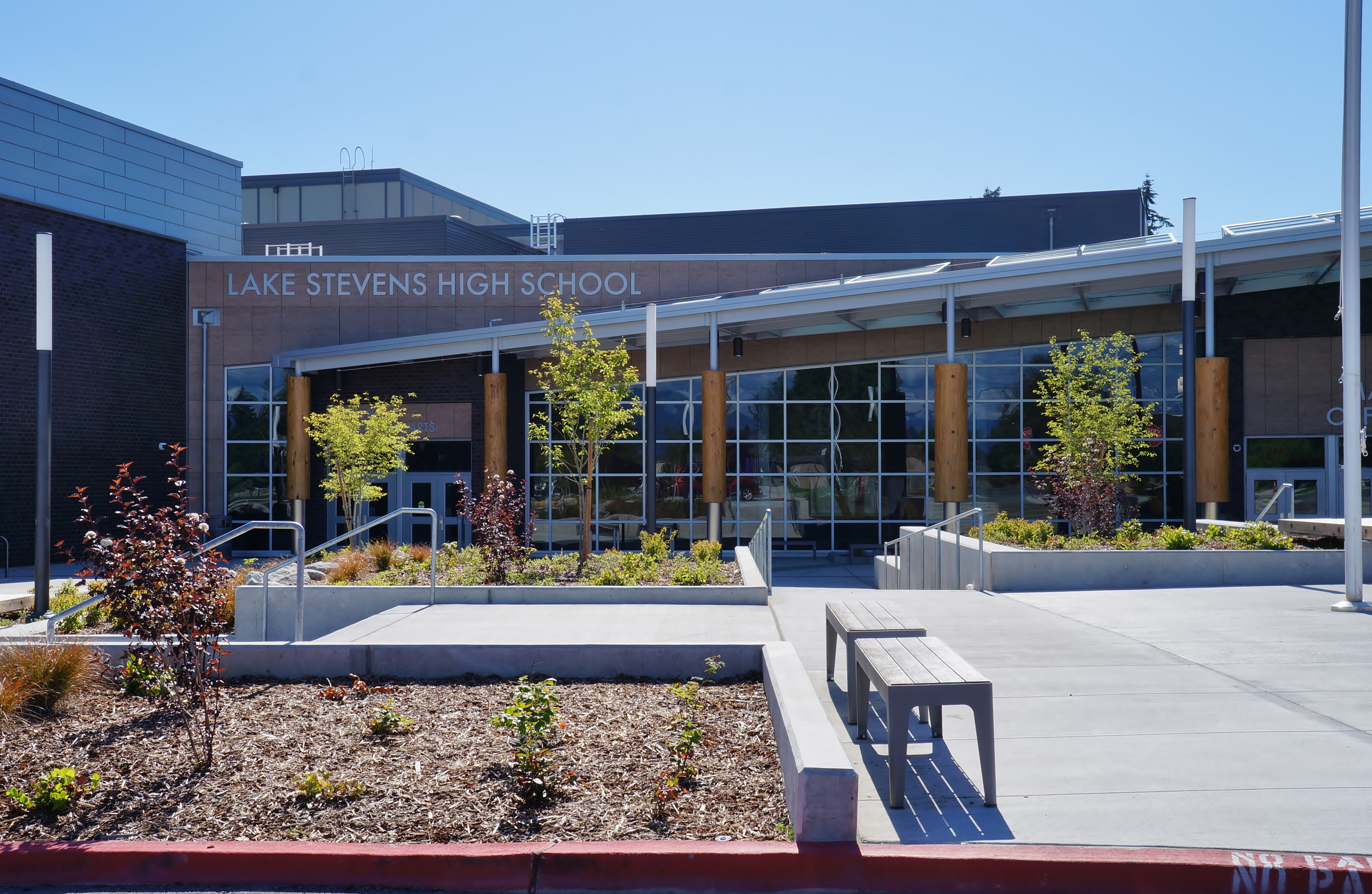
- Front entrance, 2020

Location
- 2908 113th Avenue NE; Lake Stevens, Washington 98258; United States

Information
- Type: Public high school
- Motto: "Home of the Vikings"
- Established: 1909
- School district: Lake Stevens School District
- Principal: Leslie Ivelia
- Teaching staff: 89.96 (FTE)
- Grades: 10–12
- Enrollment: 2,187 (2023–2024)
- Student to teacher ratio: 24.31
- Colors: Purple, gold
- Athletics conference: Wesco 4A
- Mascot: Viking
- Team name: Vikings
- Newspaper: Valhalla
- Yearbook: The Rune
- Website: lshs.lkstevens.wednet.edu

Lake Stevens High School is a high school located in Lake Stevens, Washington, United States. It is the only high school in the Lake Stevens School District and is assigned students from grades 10 to 12.

== History ==
LSHS first opened in 1909 at a site that is now home to North Lake Middle School. Painted with surplus paint with a pinkish hue sometime between 1958 and 1959, the school was eventually nicknamed the "Pink Palace". After the 1978–1979 school year, the building was demolished, and students began at the current LSHS location in the fall of 1979.

LSHS has since moved to its current location on 113th Avenue, and the current school was remodeled in the 1990s and again in the summer of 2007. The original football stadium, which seated 1,200 spectators, was demolished in November 2009 and replaced by a larger, 2,600-seat stadium.

A $116 million bond was approved by Lake Stevens voters in 2016 to finance a major renovation of LSHS and other projects in the district. Construction began in June 2018 on a three-story educational building that would include 27 classrooms, a student hub, and athletic facilities. The building was expected to open in September 2019, but the project was delayed by a labor strike and extreme weather. It opened in November 2019 and was formally dedicated in February 2020.

== School activities ==
Several school programs use names that reference the region's Scandinavian heritage, which is also reflected in the "Vikings" mascot. The annual yearbook is known as The Rune, while the student newspaper is The Valhalla.

Lake Stevens High School has four bands which all play at both the fall and spring concerts and at a large number of festivals and ensembles. These bands are the two jazz bands, the wind ensemble, and the concert band. All the bands come together to make the Viking Pep Band, which plays at all home football and basketball games and participates in school assemblies. The bands have won many awards from festivals such as MPMEA, Pasco, and BDX.

== Athletics ==
LSHS is a member of the 4A WESCO North Division of the Washington Interscholastic Activities Association and fields teams in several sports. The Lake Stevens High School football team is the 10-peat champions of the Wesco 4A Conference as of 2022. Lake Stevens won their first state championship in football in 2022 defeating Kennedy Catholic 24-22. Lake Stevens repeated as state champions in 2023, defeating Graham-Kapowsin 31-6.

The boys' soccer team has been nationally ranked by the Adidas National Soccer Association of America. In the 2006 season, their peak ranking was #9 in the national poll and #2 in their region, they finished fourth in state that year. In 2010, the boys' soccer team completed its most successful season to date, winning Wesco North and All Wesco district titles and eventually making it into the state finals. In the same year, the boys' soccer team was also ranked #21 out of 50 on ESPN's FAB 50, which ranks the top 50 teams in the nation.

=== Wrestling ===
The boys' varsity wrestling team has won 11 state titles: 1990, 2000, 2001, 2004, 2007, 2008, 2009, 2011, 2012, 2013, 2016. The team went 18 years without losing a WESCO league match, last losing to Lynnwood High School during the 1993 season. In the 2007–2008 season, the streak ended with a loss to Snohomish High School by a margin of 18–31. However, the team went on to win the state championship that same year. MTV featured the Lake Stevens High School wrestling team in an episode of True Life in 2012, the episode entitled, "On The Mat".

== Notable alumni ==
- Mitch Canham - Former Oregon State catcher and current Head Coach for the Oregon State Beavers baseball team.
- Jacob Eason - Former NFL quarterback.
- Marv Harshman - Member of the National Basketball Hall of Fame
- Steve Hobbs - 16th Secretary of State of Washington
- Kathryn Holloway, American Paralympic volleyballist
- Cory Kennedy - Pro-skateboarder
- Chris Pratt - Television and Film actor. Television shows such as Everwood, The O.C., and Parks and Recreation. Films such as The Lego Movie and Guardians of the Galaxy.
- Stephen Thompson - Played in Super Bowl III (New York Jets), currently a pastor in Marysville, Washington.
- Ryan Verdugo - Former Major League Baseball pitcher (Kansas City Royals, Boston Red Sox)
