= Lake Stevens, Washington =

City in Washington, United States

Lake Stevens
- City
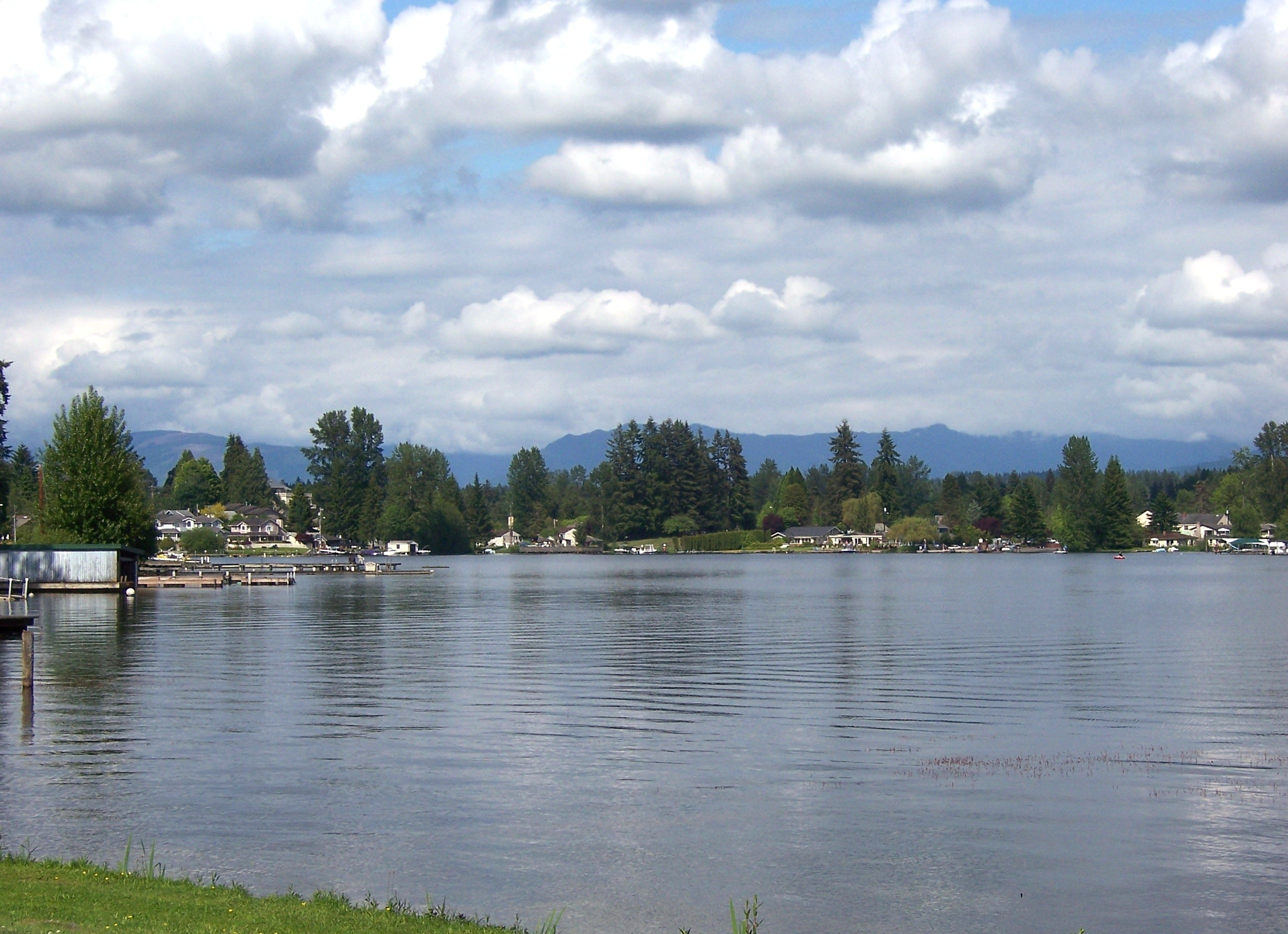
- Northeast shore of lake on which the city is located
- Motto(s): "One community, around the lake"
- Interactive map of Lake Stevens
- Coordinates: 48°1′11″N 122°3′58″W
- Country: United States
- State: Washington
- County: Snohomish
- Founded: 1889
- Incorporated: November 29, 1960

Government
  - Type: Mayor–council
  - Mayor: Kurt Hilt

Area
  - Total: 9.30 sq mi (24.09 km^{2})
  - Land: 9.17 sq mi (23.74 km^{2})
  - Water: 0.14 sq mi (0.35 km^{2})
- Elevation: 217 ft (66 m)

Population (2020)
  - Total: 35,630
  - Estimate (2024): 41,350
  - Density: 3,887/sq mi (1,500.9/km^{2})
- Time zone: UTC−8 (Pacific (PST))
  - Summer (DST): UTC−7 (PDT)
- ZIP Code: 98258
- Area code: 425
- FIPS code: 53-37900
- GNIS feature ID: 1512695
- Website: lakestevenswa.gov

Lake Stevens is a city in Snohomish County, Washington, United States, that is named for the lake it surrounds. It is located 6 miles (9.7 km) east of Everett and borders the cities of Marysville to the northwest and Snohomish to the south. The city's population was 35,630 at the 2020 census.

The lake was named in 1859 for territorial governor Isaac Stevens and was originally home to the Skykomish in the Pilchuck River basin. The first modern settlement on Lake Stevens was founded at the northeastern corner of the lake in 1889. It was later sold to the Rucker Brothers, who opened a sawmill in 1907 that spurred early growth in the area, but closed in 1925 after the second of two major fires. The Lake Stevens area then became a resort community before developing into a commuter town in the 1960s and 1970s.

Lake Stevens was incorporated as a city in 1960, following an exodus of businesses from the downtown area to a new shopping center. The city has since grown through annexations to encompass most of the lake, including the original shopping center, and quadrupled in population from 2000 to 2010. A revitalized downtown area is planned alongside new civic buildings in the 2020s.

== History ==
Lake Stevens was named in 1859 for territorial governor Isaac Stevens and was originally listed as "Stevens Lake" on early maps. The area around the lake was used for berry gathering by the indigenous Skykomish, who also used most of the Pilchuck River basin for hunting. The first homesteads around the lake were established by emigrants in the 1880s, beginning with Joseph William Davison's 160-acre (0.65 km^{2}) claim along the east shore filed in 1886. A two-block townsite at the northeast end of the lake named "Outing" was claimed on October 8, 1889, by Charles A. Missimer and platted the following year. The construction of the Seattle, Lake Shore and Eastern Railway along the eastern side of the Pilchuck River Valley in 1889 spurred the creation of more settlements in the area. Among them were Machias in 1890, which was followed by Hartford (originally named "Ferry"), later a major junction for the Everett and Monte Cristo Railway completed in 1892.

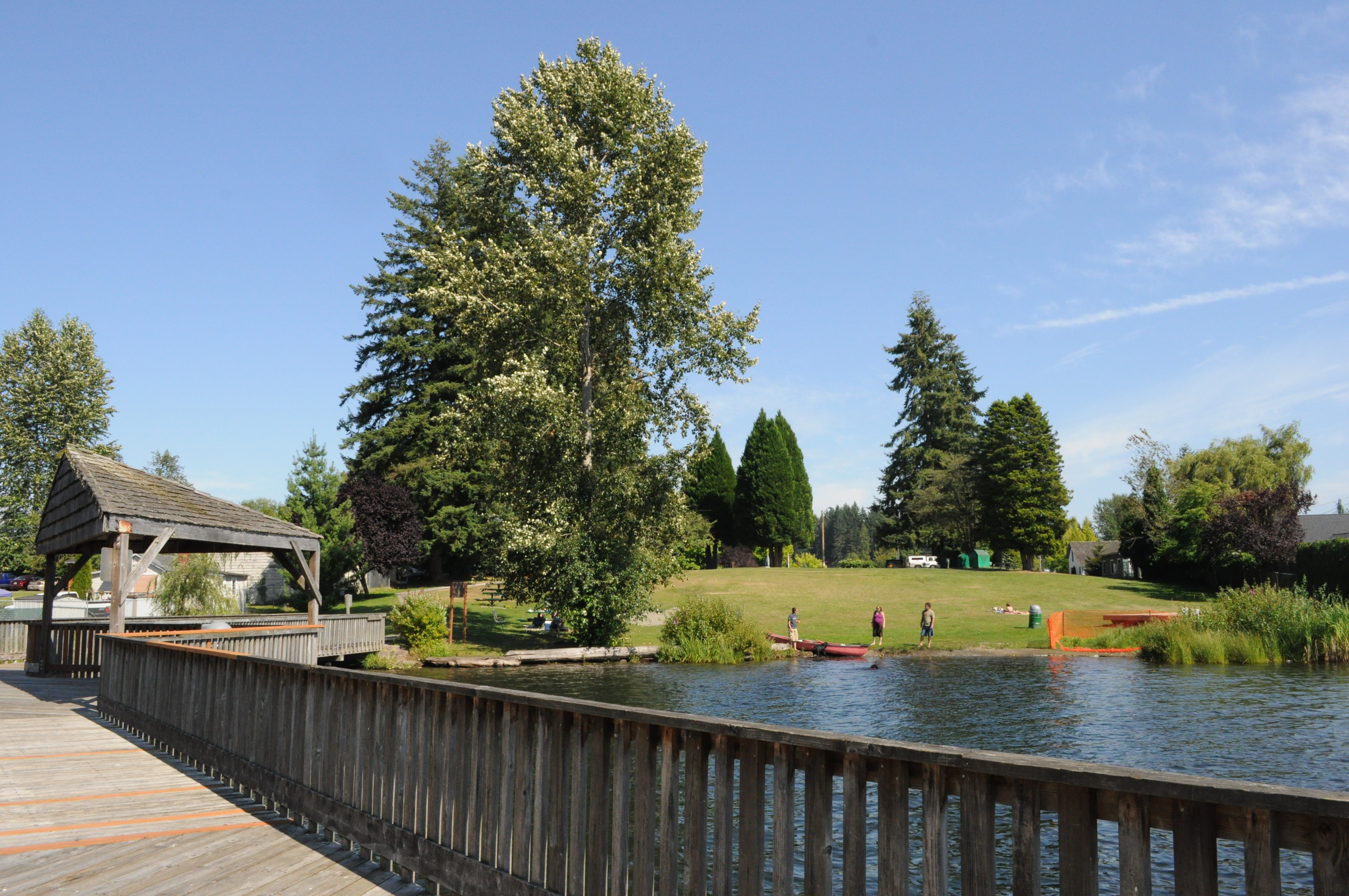
North Cove Park, near the former site of the Rucker Brothers sawmill

Outing was later vacated and sold between various investors before the townsite was acquired in 1905 by the Rucker Brothers, who planned to build a sawmill after a previous venture by Jacob Falconer had failed. The Rucker Brothers constructed a railroad spur from Hartford and redirected the flow of Cassidy Creek, the main outlet of the lake, to prepare land for their shingle mill, which opened in 1907. A plat for the town of Lake Stevens was filed by the Rucker Brothers on February 8, 1908, including a business district and residences to accommodate the mill's 250 workers. The sawmill, one of the largest in the United States, was partially destroyed in a 1919 fire and later rebuilt. It was permanently closed after a second fire in 1925 and dismantled, causing many residents to leave the area. One of the remnants from the old mill was a locomotive that sunk in the early 1910s and was rediscovered in 1995 by a U.S. Navy training team, following a request from the local historical society.

By the mid-1920s, the entire shoreline of Lake Stevens had been divided into small lots and tracts for summer homes and resorts. Following the demise of the Rucker mill, Lake Stevens was primarily a resort community that drew 3,000 visitors on busy days to fish, swim, and water-ski on the lake. While the major lakeside resorts were successful, the Lake Stevens area saw little residential and commercial development for several decades as the downtown area stagnated. The first Hewitt Avenue Trestle was completed in 1939, providing an elevated highway over the Snohomish River floodplain between Everett and Cavalero Hill, with onward connections to areas around Lake Stevens.

Suburban development around Lake Stevens began in the 1950s, shortly after plans were announced to build a large shopping center named Frontier Village at the intersection of two state highways west of the lake (later State Route 9 and State Route 204). Business owners in downtown Lake Stevens proposed incorporation in 1958 to prevent retailers from relocating to the new shopping center, offering local control of policing and street maintenance with no increase in taxes. On November 19, 1960, Lake Stevens voted 299–40 in favor of incorporating as a city, which was certified by the state government on November 29. The town boundaries were set around downtown and included an estimated 900 residents. The city government purchased a former post office building for use as a city hall, which included a jail that was never used due to a change in state laws.

The development of resorts around Lake Stevens also caused water quality to deteriorate, necessitating the creation of a voluntary drainage district in 1932 to manage runoff and pollution. It was replaced in 1963 by an independent sewer district, which mandated vegetation buffers for homes and later installed a large aeration system to slow the growth of algae in the lake. Frontier Village opened in 1960 and later expanded as State Route 9 and State Route 204 were improved through the area. A new highway bypassing downtown, State Route 92, opened at the end of the decade. The area around Frontier Village was developed into a suburban commuter town in the 1970s and 1980s with the construction of several residential subdivisions. Hewlett-Packard won approval from the county government to build a 125-acre (51 ha) manufacturing plant northwest of Lake Stevens in 1983, despite opposition from local residents looking to preserve the area's rural character.

By the late 1990s, the city had over 5,700 residents and was among the fastest-growing cities in the state. The unincorporated areas to the west of the lake also grew to over 20,000 people, adding multi-family housing to its existing inventory of single-family neighborhoods, and rejected an attempt to build a second shopping center and commercial complex on Cavalero Hill. Lake Stevens unsuccessfully attempted to annex the western neighborhoods in 1993, but adopted plans to create "one community around the lake" and revitalize its downtown. The first major annexations were completed in 2006, adding 1,563 acres (633 ha) around Frontier Village and the north end of the lake. From 2000 to 2010, the city quadrupled in population to nearly 30,000 people and added 5 square miles (13 km^{2}). The largest annexation, consisting of 9 square miles (23 km^{2}) in the southwest corner of the Lake Stevens urban growth area, was completed in December 2009 and added more than 10,000 residents. Further annexations of areas to the southeast of the lake are planned to complete the full encirclement of Lake Stevens.

The city government adopted plans in 2018 to redevelop downtown Lake Stevens with denser housing and commercial use, including mixed-use buildings and walkable streets. The former city hall in downtown was demolished in 2017 as part of an expansion for North Cove Park, with city services temporarily relocated at an adjacent building until a permanent replacement is built. The redeveloped North Cove Park is anchored by The Mill, an events space owned and operated by the city government, and also includes a playground and observation deck. The Lake Stevens police station was relocated to an abandoned fire station and plans to open a new headquarters building on Chapel Hill. An earlier plan to combine city services, the police station, and a new library at a civic campus on Chapel Hill fell through after the failure of a library bond measure. The 3-acre (1.2 ha) property had been acquired in 2016 and is planned to be rezoned for commercial use.

== Geography ==
Lake Stevens is located 35 miles (56 km) northeast of Seattle and 6 miles (9.7 km) northeast of Everett, between the cities of Marysville and Snohomish. The city's boundaries are generally defined to the north by State Route 92, to the east by the Centennial Trail, to the south by 28th Street Southeast, and to the west by State Route 204. According to the United States Census Bureau, the city has a total area of 9.30 square miles (24.09 km^{2}), of which 9.17 square miles (23.75 km^{2}) is land and 0.14 square miles (0.36 km^{2}) is water. The eponymous lake is not part of the city, but is part of the unincorporated urban growth area that also covers several neighborhoods on the southeast side of the lake. The urban growth area has been sought for annexations in the early 21st century.

The city lies on a plateau between the Snohomish River delta, which separates it from Everett and Ebey Island to the west, and the foothills of the Cascade Mountains. It surrounds the north and east sides of Lake Stevens, the largest and deepest lake in Snohomish County, with an area of 1,040 acres (420 ha) and an average depth of 64 feet (20 m). The lake has 7.1 miles (11.4 km) of shoreline and is fed by Lundeen Creek, Mitchell (Kokanee) Creek, and Stitch Creek. It drains into Catherine Creek, which then flows to the Pilchuck River. The lake's relatively small watershed, at 4,371 acres (1,769 ha), minimizes the effect of upstream pollution but reduces flow to remove pollutants. Lake Stevens installed aeration system in the 1990s to control the release of phosphorus from lake sediments, which caused unwanted algae growth. Most of the shoreline is heavily developed, with little remaining native vegetation, and Lake Stevens is used for recreational fishing, swimming, boating, and skiing.

Lake Stevens has two major commercial centers: downtown and Frontier Village. Downtown Lake Stevens is located on the northeastern arm of the lake and has been undergoing redevelopment since the 1990s. Frontier Village is located west of the lake at the intersection of State Route 9 and State Route 204 and is a traditional suburban shopping center with strip malls and big box stores. The city government also has several designated neighborhoods and planning areas: Cavalero Hill, Frontier Village, the Hartford Industrial Area, and Machias.

== Economy ==
As of 2018, Lake Stevens has an estimated workforce population of 23,393 people, of which 15,084 are employed. The largest sectors of employment are manufacturing (18%), followed by educational and health services (17%), retail (13%), and professional services (11%). The majority of workers in the city commute to other areas for employment, including 20 percent to Everett, 13 percent to Seattle, and 4 percent to Bellevue. Approximately 6.3 percent of Lake Stevens residents work within the city limits. Over 81 percent of workers commute in single-occupant vehicles, while 2 percent take public transportation and less than 10 percent use carpools.

The city had 1,553 registered businesses with 4,202 total jobs, according to 2012 estimates by the U.S. Census and Puget Sound Regional Council. The largest provider of jobs in Lake Stevens came from businesses in the services sector, at 1,595, followed by education (991) and retail (696). The city's largest employer is the Lake Stevens School District, followed by aerospace manufacturer Cobalt Enterprises, which is headquartered in the Hartford industrial area and expanded its facilities in 2016. Over 20 percent of people with jobs based in Lake Stevens live within city limits, while the rest commute from nearby cities in northern Snohomish County.

Hewlett-Packard opened a large manufacturing facility on Soper Hill northwest of Lake Stevens in 1985 for its test and measurement division, following a planning dispute with the county government. The test and measurement division was later spun off into Agilent and shared its Lake Stevens facility with Solectron. The 270,000-square-foot (25,000 m^{2}) plant had 1,000 employees at its peak, but was closed in 2002 after several rounds of layoffs. The 133-acre (54 ha) site was later redeveloped into a suburban housing complex in the mid-2000s.

Lake Stevens is home to a large retail district anchored by Frontier Village, a shopping center located at the intersection of State Route 9 and State Route 204. It was developed beginning in the 1960s and now encompasses more than 208,000 square feet (19,300 m^{2}) of retail space, spread across several strip malls. A Costco store opened in December 2022 at the intersection of State Route 9 and 20th Street Southeast with a 160,000-square-foot (15,000 m^{2}) building, a gas station with 30 pumps, and 800 parking stalls. A development agreement was approved by the city government in December 2019 after a year of planning and several lawsuits from residents over impacts to the environment and traffic conditions.

== Demographics ==
Historical population
Census	Pop.	Note	%±
1950	2,586		—
1960	1,538		−40.5%
1970	1,283		−16.6%
1980	1,660		29.4%
1990	3,380		103.6%
2000	6,361		88.2%
2010	28,069		341.3%
2020	35,630		26.9%
2024 (est.)	41,350		16.1%
U.S. Decennial Census

Lake Stevens is the sixth-largest city in Snohomish County, with a population of 35,630 as of the 2020 census. The city has been the fastest-growing in the county since 2000, with its population increasing by 18 percent from 2010 to 2018 through new residential development in the southwest and annexation of other areas. The city was originally the 11th largest in the county, but jumped to fifth by annexing 10,000 people in December 2009.

=== 2020 census ===
As of the 2020 census, there were 35,630 people and 12,085 households living in Lake Stevens, which had a population density of 3,887.2 inhabitants per square mile (1,500.9/km^{2}). There were 12,367 total housing units, of which 97.7% were occupied and 2.3% were vacant or for occasional use. The racial makeup of the city was 74.3% White, 0.7% Native American and Alaskan Native, 2.4% Black or African American, 5.8% Asian, and 0.5% Native Hawaiian and Pacific Islander. Residents who listed another race were 4.1% of the population and those who identified as more than one race were 12.3% of the population. Hispanic or Latino residents of any race were 11.0% of the population.

Of the 12,085 households in Lake Stevens, 58.2% were married couples living together and 7.9% were cohabitating but unmarried. Households with a male householder with no spouse or partner were 13.9% of the population, while households with a female householder with no spouse or partner were 20.0% of the population. Out of all households, 44.3% had children under the age of 18 living with them and 20.9% had residents who were 65 years of age or older. There were 12,085 occupied housing units in Lake Stevens, of which 75.7% were owner-occupied and 24.3% were occupied by renters.

The median age in the city was 35.0 years old for all sexes, 34.2 years old for males, and 35.6 years old for females. Of the total population, 30.9% of residents were under the age of 19; 28.6% were between the ages of 20 and 39; 30.9% were between the ages of 40 and 64; and 9.6% were 65 years of age or older. The gender makeup of the city was 49.8% male and 50.2% female.

=== 2010 census ===
As of the 2010 census, there were 28,069 people, 9,810 households, and 7,250 families residing in the city. The population density was 3,160.9 inhabitants per square mile (1,220.4/km^{2}). There were 10,414 housing units at an average density of 1,172.7 per square mile (452.8/km^{2}). The racial makeup of the city was 85.1% White, 1.7% African American, 0.9% Native American, 3.6% Asian, 0.4% Pacific Islander, 3.2% from other races, and 5.1% from two or more races. Hispanic or Latino of any race were 8.6% of the population.

There were 9,810 households, of which 45.1% had children under the age of 18 living with them, 56.3% were married couples living together, 11.9% had a female householder with no husband present, 5.8% had a male householder with no wife present, and 26.1% were non-families. 19.1% of all households were made up of individuals, and 5.2% had someone living alone who was 65 years of age or older. The average household size was 2.86 and the average family size was 3.26.

The median age in the city was 32.5 years. 29.9% of residents were under the age of 18; 8.5% were between the ages of 18 and 24; 32.2% were from 25 to 44; 23% were from 45 to 64; and 6.5% were 65 years of age or older. The gender makeup of the city was 49.9% male and 50.1% female.

== Government and politics ==
Lake Stevens is a non-charter code city with a mayor–council system of government. The city council serves as the legislative body of the city government and has seven members who are elected at-large to four-year terms in staggered elections. The council holds regular meetings twice a month at the Lake Stevens School District administrative headquarters and a work session during other weeks as needed. The mayor is a full-time position that is also elected by Lake Stevens residents and serves as the executive of the city government during a four-year term. Former city councilmember Kurt Hilt has been mayor since 2026, when he was appointed to fill the position after his predecessor resigned.

The city government has budgeted expenditures of $50.4 million and revenues of $43.4 million in 2020, largely funded by sales, property, and utility taxes. It has 85 employees organized into departments of economic development, finance, human resources, parks and recreation, planning, policing, and public works. Lake Stevens has several non-elected executive positions, including the city administrator, city clerk, police chief, planning director, public works director, and community programs planner. Several regional agencies provide other services, such as fire protection, library access, and water management.

In addition to elected and executive positions, Lake Stevens has seven boards and commissions that advise the city council on a variety of specific issues. They are composed of volunteer citizens who are appointed to set terms by the mayor with the approval of the city council. The boards and commissions are tasked with managing arts, civil service and police, the public library, parks and recreation, planning, city salaries, and veterans' rights.

At the federal level, Lake Stevens is part of the 1st congressional district, which is represented by Democrat Suzan DelBene and stretches from Arlington to Bellevue. The city was part of the 2nd congressional district until a redistricting in 2012 that split most of Northwestern Washington. At the state level, Lake Stevens shares the 39th legislative district with Darrington, Granite Falls, and eastern Skagit County. It was part of the 44th legislative district until 2022. The city lies in the Snohomish County Council's 5th district, which also includes Snohomish and the Skykomish Valley.

== Culture ==
The city's annual summer festival, Aquafest, is held at North Cove Park in downtown Lake Stevens over a three-day weekend in late July. It was founded in 1960 and includes a boat parade, carnival rides, a car show, and a circus. The 2018 festival was attended by 30,000 people. An annual Ironman 70.3 triathlon was added to Aquafest in the 2000s and features a 70.3-mile (113.1 km) course with swimming, cycling, and running segments. The triathlon also serves as a qualifier for the Ironman World Championship.

=== Parks and recreation ===
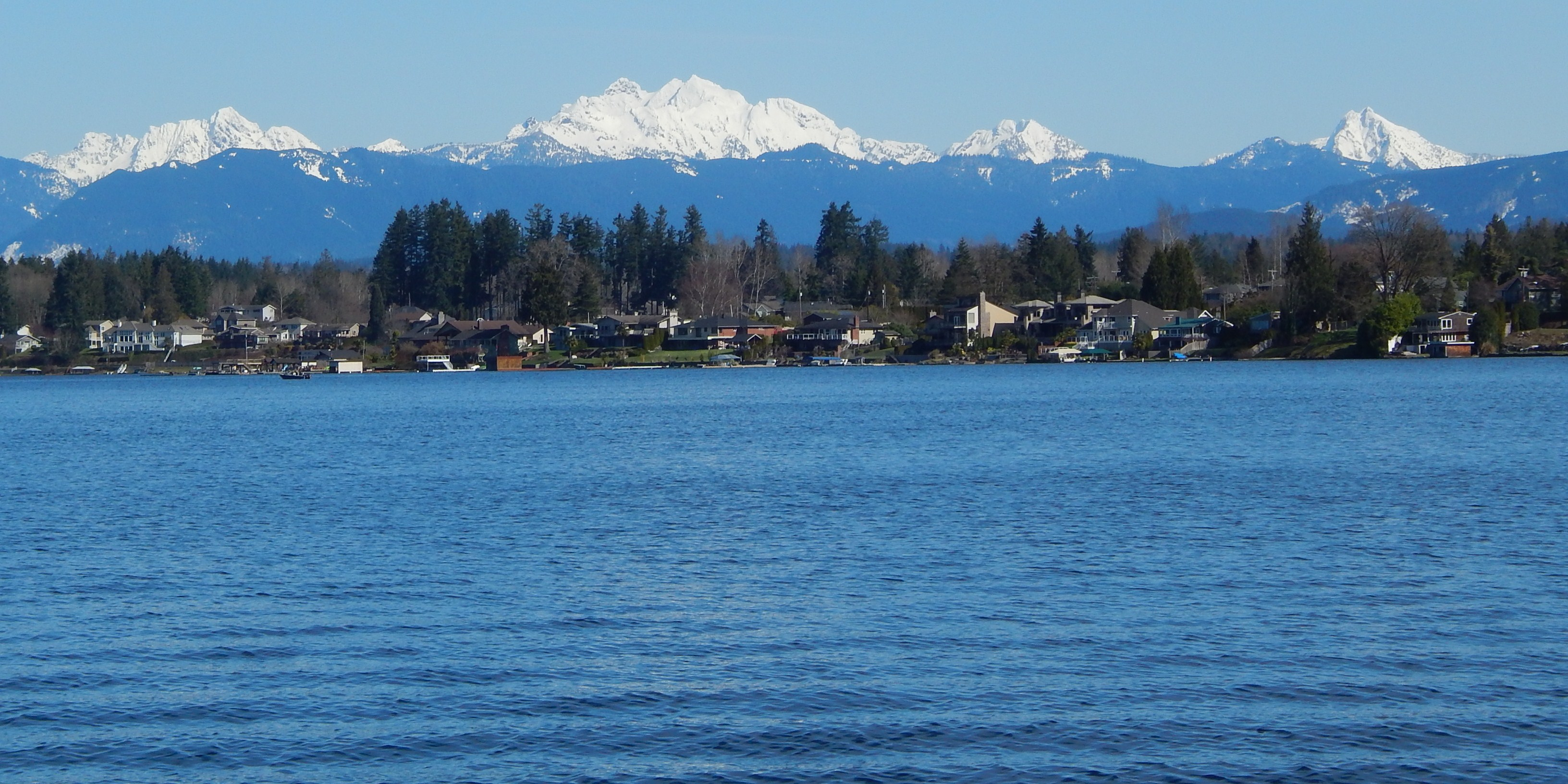
Cascade Mountains seen from Davies Beach

Lake Stevens has 195 acres (79 ha) of parks and open space managed by the city government, Snohomish County, and the Washington Department of Fish and Wildlife. The city government owns 158 acres (64 ha) and has nine parks that are categorized as community parks, neighborhood parks, mini-parks, and other facilities. In addition to public facilities, the Lake Stevens area has 139 acres (56 ha) of private parks and open spaces that are owned by homeowner associations and other entities.

The largest city-owned park is Cavalero Hill Park, a 35-acre (14 ha) site in southwestern Lake Stevens that was originally opened by the county government in 2009. It was transferred to the city government in 2025 and consists of open fields, sports courts, a playground, two fenced dog parks, and a skate park. The largest undeveloped park is Eagle Ridge Community Park, located on 28 acres (11 ha) near the northwest shore of the lake. Lake Stevens Community Park is located east of downtown and includes several soccer and baseball fields on 43 acres (17 ha) of former timber land. Davies Beach (formerly Willard Wyatt Park) lies at the foot of Chapel Hill on the western lakeshore and includes a beach, boat launch, and a boathouse for rowing teams.

Several city parks are located along the shore of Lake Stevens, providing beaches with swimming areas and fishing docks. Lundeen Park is the largest of the city's beaches and was developed out of a former resort that opened in 1908. It also offers paddleboard and kayak rentals, a visitors center, and a concession stand. At the northeast end of the lake is North Cove Park, a downtown park that was redeveloped into an urban gathering space in 2021. A disc golf course was opened in 2000 at Catherine Creek Park, a small park with hiking trails and natural areas.

The county government also owns Centennial Trail, an inter-city hiking, bicycling, and equestrian rail trail. It travels 30 miles (48 km) between Arlington and Snohomish, passing through the east side of Lake Stevens. The city has several short trails that are owned by the Lake Stevens School District and private housing subdivisions, along with informal trails along a transmission line corridor. Lake Stevens plans to develop and connect these routes into a full network, including the Bayview Trail on the transmission line in collaboration with the City of Marysville. The city government also manages a community center near the city hall and library. Several local rowing clubs use Lake Stevens, including the in-city Lake Stevens Rowing Club that was founded in 1997.

=== Historical preservation ===
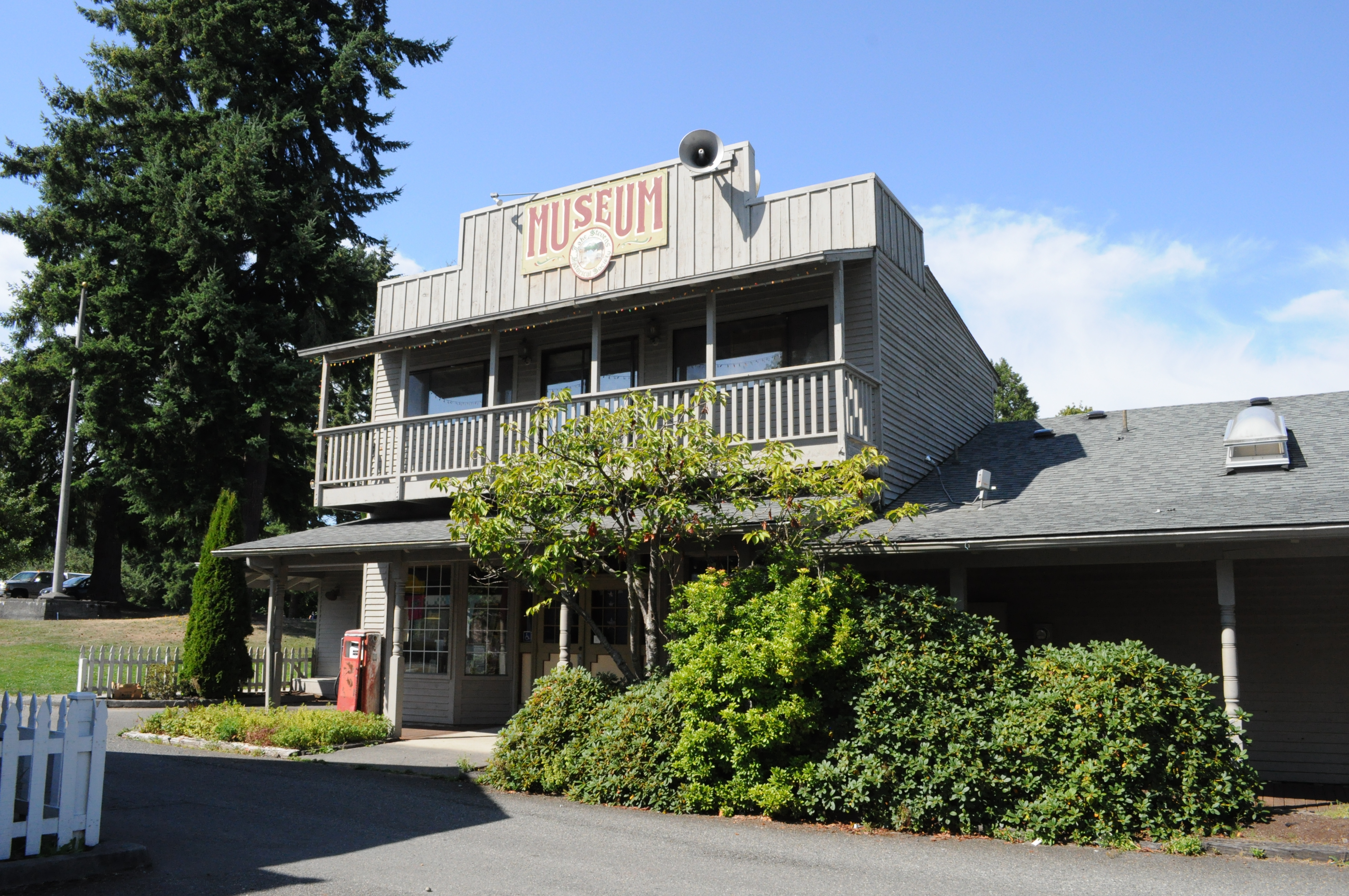
The Lake Stevens Historical Museum at its former location, opened in 1989

The local historical society operated a museum adjacent to the city library that opened in 1989 and included exhibits with fixtures from historic buildings and a collection of documents and photographs. The museum grounds also included the Grimm House, a historic house that is listed on the National Register of Historic Places. The house was constructed in 1903 for a mill worker and moved to the museum grounds in 1996, later undergoing extensive renovations before opening for public tours in 2004. The museum was closed and demolished in June 2017 as part of the North Cove Park redevelopment, which also included moving the Grimm House to a new location in 2021. A three-story retail building adjacent to the Grimm House is planned to open in 2026 and include a permanent home for the museum.

== Notable people ==
- Travis Bracht, singer
- Jacob Eason, professional American football player
- Cory Kennedy, professional skateboarder
- Kathryn Holloway, Paralympic volleyball player
- Christopher Miller, filmmaker and director
- Chris Pratt, actor
- Roger Sweet, toy designer and creator of Masters of the Universe
- Karla Wilson, politician

== Education ==
The Lake Stevens School District operates a system of public schools within the city and surrounding areas, including a portion of southeastern Marysville. The school district had an enrollment of approximately 8,838 students in 2016, with 436 total teachers and 239 other staff. It has one high school, Lake Stevens High School, which opened at its current campus in 1979 and was approved for renovation work in 2016. The renovation cost $116 million and began construction in June 2018, opening its first phase in November 2019. The school district also has one mid-high school for grades 8–9, two middle schools, and seven elementary schools. The newest elementary school, Stevens Creek, opened in 2018 alongside an adjacent early learning center.

The city's nearest post-secondary educational institutions are Everett Community College and Edmonds College. During the late 2000s, Lake Stevens was a leading candidate for a proposed branch campus of the University of Washington (UW). The city government presented a 98-acre (40 ha) site on the southwest side of Cavalero Hill that was among the four finalists in 2007, but attracted controversy from neighbors for using land promised for a county park. The Lake Stevens proposal scored the lowest in a survey of the finalists and the project was abandoned entirely in 2008 due to a state budget shortfall.

=== Library ===
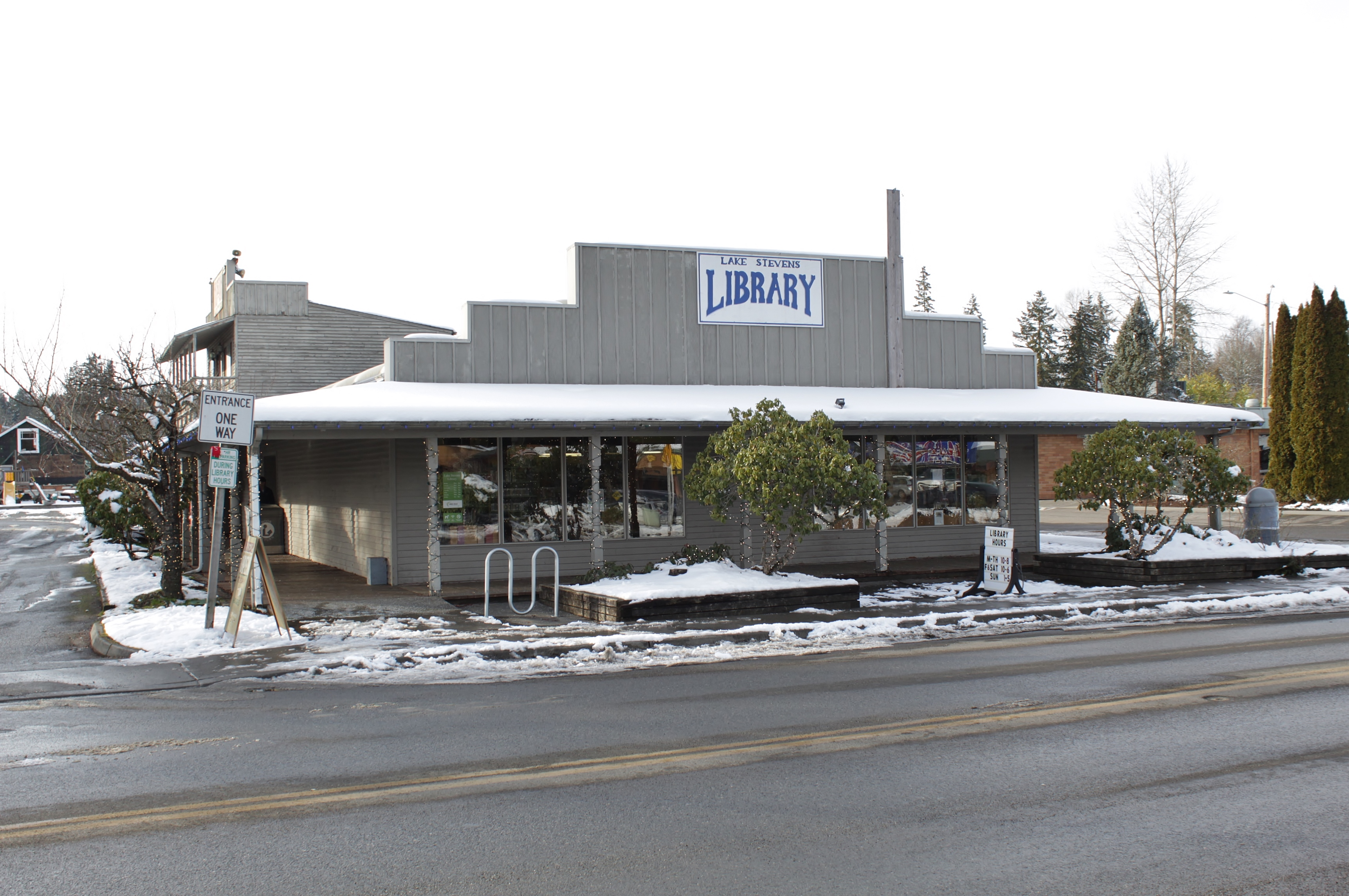
The former Lake Stevens library, managed by Sno-Isle Libraries and open from 1985 to 2021

The first public library in Lake Stevens opened in 1946 at the home of a local resident and moved into a former post office three years later. The city government moved the library to a former pharmacy in 1985 and contracted with Sno-Isle Libraries, an inter-county system that later annexed Lake Stevens in 2008. The 2,400-square-foot (220 m^{2}) downtown library building was the smallest in the Sno-Isle system and was determined to be unable to support the community's needs, necessitating plans for a replacement in the 2010s.

Sno-Isle proposed a larger library with 20,000 square feet (1,900 m^{2}) of space as part of a civic campus on Chapel Hill near Frontier Village, which would cost $17 million and be financed by a bond issue paid through property taxes. The bond was approved by voters in the February 2017 election, but fell 749 votes short of meeting the turnout requirement to pass. A second attempt in February 2018 was also rejected after failing to meet the 60 percent threshold for bonds.

The library was demolished in June 2021 as part of renovations to North Cove Park and was replaced with a temporary library at Lundeen Park. Sno-Isle moved into a former police station in August after it was renovated into a new facility with fewer amenities. In January 2022, the city government proposed leaving the Sno-Isle system and using levy funds for the proposed civic campus as well as a privatized library system. A few days later, the proposal was withdrawn and Sno-Isle announced that it would continue to pursue plans for a permanent library building with $3.1 million in state grants. Site clearing at a site on Chapel Hill for the new library began in March 2023. The two-story library building, which incorporates cross-laminated timber and includes 15,000 square feet (1,400 m^{2}) of space, is scheduled to open in late 2026.

== Infrastructure ==
=== Transportation ===
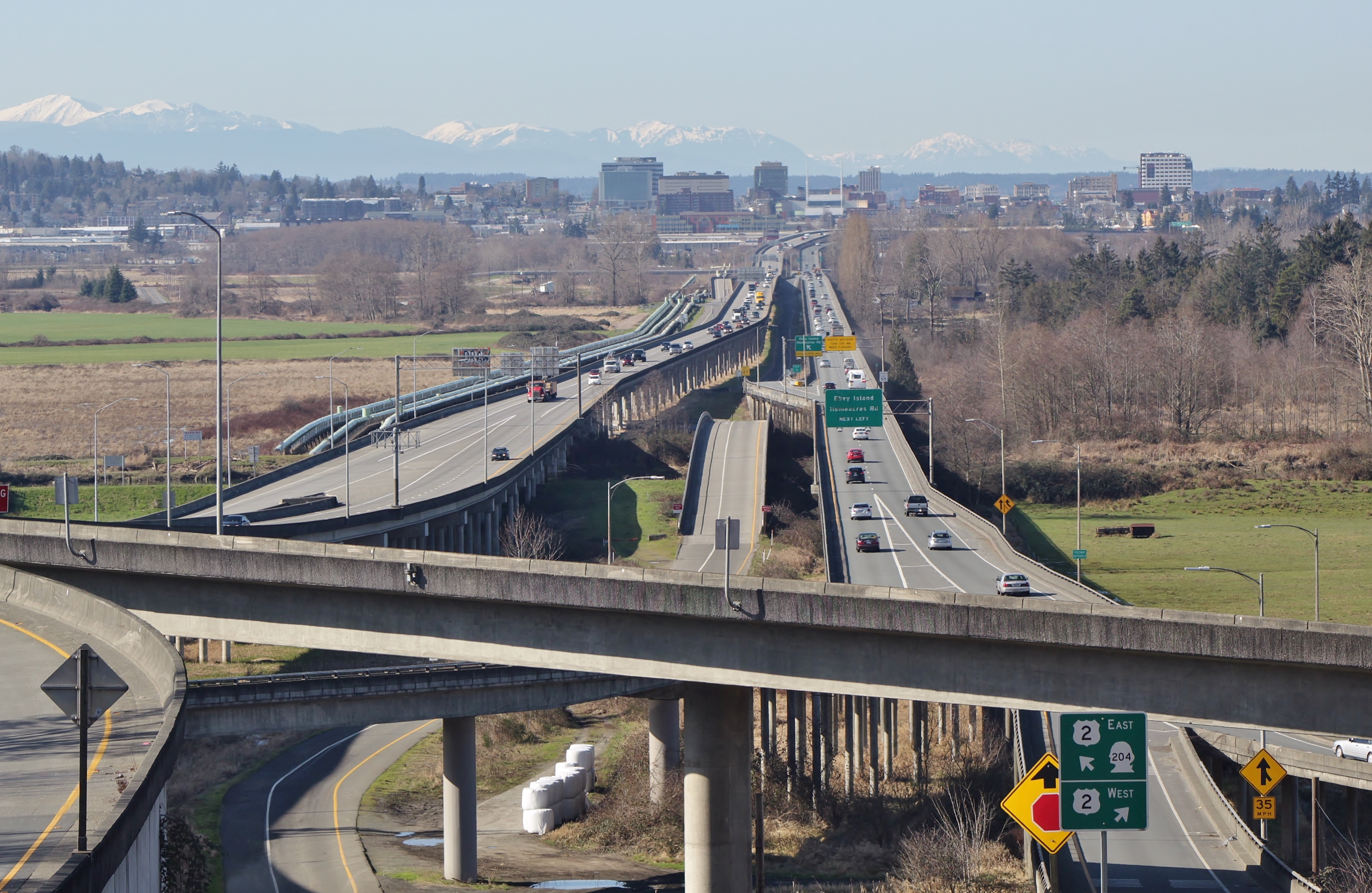
Looking west from Lake Stevens at the Hewitt Avenue Trestle, which carries U.S. Route 2 towards Everett

Lake Stevens is traversed by three state highways that connect the area to other parts of Snohomish County: State Route 9, running north–south through the west of the city and continuing to Snohomish and Arlington; State Route 92, which continues northeast to Granite Falls; and State Route 204, which connects Frontier Village to U.S. Route 2 (US 2). The intersection of State Route 9 and State Route 204 and several roads around Frontier Village were replaced by a series of four roundabouts in 2023 after a proposed interchange was scrapped. The Hewitt Avenue Trestle, which carries US 2 to Everett, is a four-lane freeway that is frequently congested and is planned to be rebuilt to fix capacity issues.

The city is also served by Community Transit, which operates bus routes between cities in Snohomish County. The agency provides all-day bus service from Lake Stevens to Everett, Granite Falls, Lynnwood, Marysville, and Snohomish. The city has a small park and ride that opened in 2004 and is served by local routes as well as an express route to Lynnwood City Center station during peak hours on weekdays. Community Transit also operates the Zip Shuttle microtransit service, which expanded to Lake Stevens in December 2024.

=== Utilities ===
The city's electricity and tap water are provided by the Snohomish County Public Utility District (PUD), a consumer-owned public utility that serves all of Snohomish County. The PUD sources its water from the City of Everett system at Spada Lake and Lake Chaplain, which is delivered to Lake Stevens and Granite Falls. The city is also bisected by a pair of north–south electrical transmission lines operated by the Bonneville Power Administration that travel towards British Columbia. Natural gas for Lake Stevens residents and businesses is provided by Puget Sound Energy.

The city government contracts with Republic Services and Waste Management to provide curbside collection and disposal of garbage, recycling, and yard waste for different areas of Lake Stevens. The Lake Stevens Sewer District, established in 1957, operates the city's sewer system and is planned to merge with the city government in 2032. The sewer district built a treatment plant in 2013 at a cost of $100 million, and the debt payments on the project have caused disputes with the city.

=== Healthcare ===
Lake Stevens has two urgent care centers that also provide medical services: a branch of The Everett Clinic (part of UnitedHealth Optum); and a 4,000-square-foot (370 m^{2}) MultiCare Indigo Urgent Care Clinic that opened in 2017.
