= Jacob Eason =

American football player (born 1997)

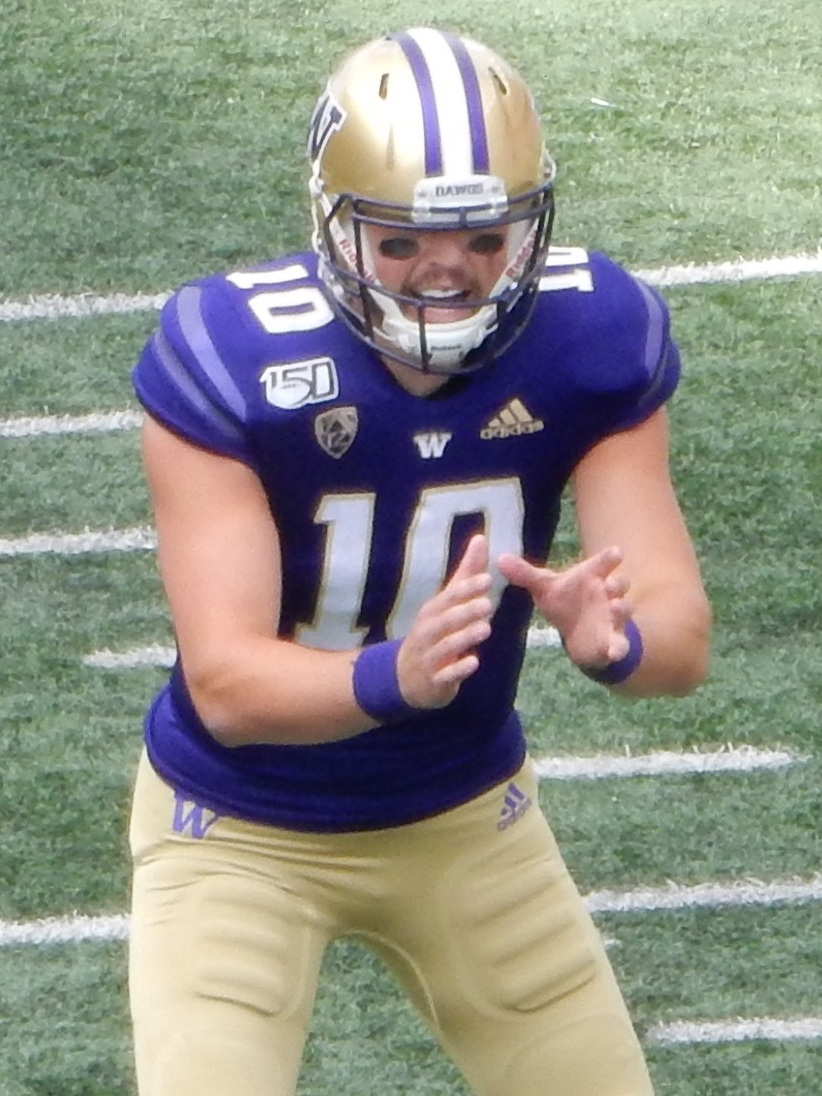
- Eason with the Washington Huskies in 2019

No. 9, 16
- Position: Quarterback

Personal information
- Born: November 17, 1997 (age 29); Lake Stevens, Washington, U.S.
- Listed height: 6 ft 6 in (1.98 m)
- Listed weight: 231 lb (105 kg)

Career information
- High school: Lake Stevens
- College: Georgia (2016–2017); Washington (2018–2019)
- NFL draft: 2020: 4th round, 122nd overall pick

Career history
- Indianapolis Colts (2020–2021); Seattle Seahawks (2021); Carolina Panthers (2022); San Francisco 49ers (2022)*; Carolina Panthers (2023)*; New York Giants (2023); Green Bay Packers (2024)*
- * Offseason or practice squad member only

Career NFL statistics
- Passing attempts: 10
- Passing completions: 5
- Completion percentage: 50.0%
- TD–INT: 0–2
- Passing yards: 84
- Passer rating: 39.2
- Stats at Pro Football Reference

Jacob Henry Eason (born November 17, 1997) is an American former professional football player who was a quarterback in the National Football League (NFL). He played college football for the Washington Huskies and Georgia Bulldogs and was selected by the Indianapolis Colts in the fourth round of the 2020 NFL draft.

Eason attended Lake Stevens High School in Lake Stevens, Washington, and was rated by Rivals as a five-star recruit. He was ranked as the best pro-style quarterback and best player overall in the 2016 class. Eason committed to the University of Georgia to play college football on July 19, 2014. He transferred to the University of Washington in 2018, though he had to sit out the 2018 season because of NCAA transfer eligibility rules. After starting in 2019, Eason decided to forgo his senior season at Washington and enter the NFL draft.

== Early life ==
Eason was born to Tony and Christine Eason and was raised in Lake Stevens, Washington. His father, Tony Eason, played college football at the University of Notre Dame, but he should not be confused with quarterback Tony Eason who played college football at the University of Illinois and later for the New England Patriots in the 1980s.

As a freshman at Lake Stevens High School, Jacob played in four games and completed 21 of 50 pass attempts (42%) for 458 yards, four touchdowns, and one interception. The following year, he played in ten games and threw 350 passes, completing 209 (59.7%) of them for 2,941 passing yards, 23 touchdowns, and eight interceptions. In 2014, he played in all 11 games for Lake Stevens and led them to a 9–2 record. He finished his junior year completing 197 of 287 passes (68.6%) for 2,829 yards, 32 touchdowns and only three interceptions. Rival's named him their Junior of the Year in 2014. During his last season at Lake Stevens, he played in 13 games, completed 235-of-338 (69.5%) pass attempts for 3,585 yards, 43 touchdowns and six interceptions. In his senior season he led them to a 12–1 record and took them all the way to the state semifinals against Skyline but ended up losing 34–37. He finished his career at Lake Stevens completing 662 out of 1,025 pass attempts for 9,813 passing yards, 102 touchdown passes and 18 interceptions, while appearing in a total of 38 games. He was ranked as the best pro-style quarterback and best player overall in the 2016 class.

He was rated a five-star recruit by Rivals, 247sports, and Scout. Rivals had Eason ranked as the top quarterback in the nation and as the 7th top prospect in the nation. Eason was a highly sought after recruit, receiving offers from Florida, Miami, Alabama, Colorado, Florida State, Michigan, Notre Dame, Oklahoma, Oklahoma State, among many others. On July 20, 2014, he committed to the University of Georgia.

College recruiting
| Name | Hometown | School | Height | Weight | 40^{‡} | Commit date |
|---|---|---|---|---|---|---|
| Jacob Eason; QB | Lake Stevens, WA | Lake Stevens (WA) | 6 ft 5 in (1.96 m) | 207 lb (94 kg) | N/A | Jul 20, 2014 |
| Jacob Eason; QB | Recruit ratings: Scout: Rivals: 247Sports: (89) | | | | | |
Overall recruit ranking:
Note: In many cases, Scout, Rivals, 247Sports, On3, and ESPN may conflict in their listings of height and weight.; In these cases, the average was taken. ESPN grades are on a 100-point scale.; Sources: "2016 Team Ranking". Rivals.com.

== College career ==
=== Georgia ===
Eason enrolled early at Georgia during the spring of 2016. Although he was not named the starter going into season opener, he came in for Georgia's fourth possession against North Carolina for senior Greyson Lambert and subsequently completed 8 of 12 passes for 131 passing yards and threw his first career collegiate touchdown. #18 Georgia went on to defeat #22 North Carolina 33–24. The following week, Eason earned his first career start against Nicholls State and finished completing 11 of 20 passes for 204 yards and a touchdown. Eason then led Georgia to a comeback victory over Missouri after he threw the game-winning touchdown on 4th and 10 to Isaiah McKenzie with only 1:29 left in the game. He finished the game with 29/55 pass attempts for 309 passing yards, 3 touchdowns, and one interception. On September 24, 2016, #12 Georgia suffered their first loss to #23 Ole Miss with Eason completing only 16 of 36 pass attempts for 137 passing yards and one interception. On October 15, 2016, Eason threw for 346 passing yards and completed 27 out of 40 pass attempts in Georgia's 16–17 loss to Vanderbilt. On November 12, 2016, he helped Georgia defeat #9 Auburn after completing 20/31 pass attempts for 208 yards.

Eason began the 2017 season as Georgia's starting quarterback. In the first game of the season against Appalachian State, Eason injured his knee on a late hit out of bounds. Freshman Jake Fromm, the highly recruited back-up quarterback, became the starter during Eason's absence. Fromm remained the starter even after Eason's recovery, and led the Bulldogs to the 2018 College Football Playoff National Championship game.

=== Washington ===
Following the 2017 season, Eason announced he would leave Georgia. The decision was widely anticipated, as Eason had lost the starting job at Georgia to Fromm. On January 9, the Seattle Times reported that Eason planned to transfer to the University of Washington, which would require that he sit out the 2018 season. The transfer was officially announced on February 6.

Eason won the starting job for the 2019 season. In his first start for the Huskies against Eastern Washington, he completed 27 of 36 passes for 349 yards and four touchdowns as Washington won 47–14. On December 26, 2019, Eason announced that he would forgo his senior year and enter the 2020 NFL draft.

== Professional career ==
Pre-draft measurables
| Height | Weight | Arm length | Hand span | Wingspan | 40-yard dash | 10-yard split | 20-yard split | 20-yard shuttle | Three-cone drill | Vertical jump | Broad jump | Wonderlic |
|---|---|---|---|---|---|---|---|---|---|---|---|---|
| 6 ft 5 7/8 in (1.98 m) | 231 lb (105 kg) | 32 7/8 in (0.84 m) | 9 1/2 in (0.24 m) | 6 ft 7 in (2.01 m) | 4.89 s | 1.73 s | 2.90 s | 4.75 s | 7.50 s | 27.5 in (0.70 m) | 9 ft 2 in (2.79 m) | 23 |
All values from NFL Combine

=== Indianapolis Colts ===
Eason was selected by the Indianapolis Colts with the 122nd overall pick in the fourth round of the 2020 NFL draft. In 2020, he served as the third-string quarterback, behind starter Philip Rivers and backup Jacoby Brissett. He did not play during his rookie season.

With the retirement of Rivers, the departure of Brissett, and the arrival of Carson Wentz, Eason came into the 2021 season competing for the backup position with rookie Sam Ehlinger; Eason eventually won the role. He made his NFL debut in Week 2 of the 2021 season, appearing in relief of Wentz, who was injured toward the end of the game against the Los Angeles Rams. He completed two out of five passes for 25 yards and one interception. On October 19, 2021, Eason was waived by the Colts.

=== Seattle Seahawks ===
On October 20, 2021, the Seattle Seahawks claimed Eason off waivers. He was waived on August 30, 2022.

=== Carolina Panthers (first stint) ===
On August 31, 2022, Eason was signed to the practice squad of the Carolina Panthers. He was elevated to the active roster on October 12, after Baker Mayfield suffered an injury. Eason appeared in relief of P. J. Walker in Week 6 against the Los Angeles Rams and went 3-for-5 for 59 yards and an interception. He returned to the practice squad following the game. He was released on November 7, 2022.

=== San Francisco 49ers ===
On November 14, 2022, he worked out with the San Francisco 49ers, signing with the team's practice squad the next day. He was released on January 3, 2023.

=== Carolina Panthers (second stint) ===
On January 24, 2023, Eason signed a reserve/future contract with the Carolina Panthers. He was waived by Carolina on May 18.

=== New York Giants ===
On November 7, 2023, Eason was signed to the New York Giants' practice squad. He was released by the Giants on December 4. Eason was re-signed to the practice squad on January 4, 2024, then signed to the active roster two days later.

=== Green Bay Packers ===
Eason was signed by the Green Bay Packers on July 23, 2024. He was released by the Packers on August 5.

== Career statistics ==
=== NFL ===
| Year | Team | Games | | Passing | | | | | | | | Rushing | | | | Sacks | | Fumbles | |
| Year | Team | GP | GS | Cmp | Att | Pct | Yds | Avg | TD | Int | Rtg | Att | Yds | Avg | TD | Sck | SckY | Fum | Lost |
|---|---|---|---|---|---|---|---|---|---|---|---|---|---|---|---|---|---|---|---|
| 2020 | IND | 0 | 0 | DNP | | | | | | | | | | | | | | | |
| 2021 | IND | 1 | 0 | 2 | 5 | 40.0 | 25 | 5.0 | 0 | 1 | 16.7 | 0 | 0 | 0.0 | 0 | 0 | 0 | 0 | 0 |
| 2021 | SEA | 0 | 0 | DNP | | | | | | | | | | | | | | | |
| 2022 | CAR | 1 | 0 | 3 | 5 | 60.0 | 59 | 11.8 | 0 | 1 | 61.7 | 0 | 0 | 0.0 | 0 | 0 | 0 | 0 | 0 |
| 2023 | NYG | 0 | 0 | DNP | | | | | | | | | | | | | | | |
| Career | | 2 | 0 | 5 | 10 | 50.0 | 84 | 8.4 | 0 | 2 | 39.2 | 0 | 0 | 0.0 | 0 | 0 | 0 | 0 | 0 |

=== College ===
| Season | Team | Games | | Passing | | | | | | | Rushing | | | |
| Season | Team | GP | GS | Cmp | Att | Pct | Yds | TD | Int | Rtg | Att | Yds | Avg | TD |
|---|---|---|---|---|---|---|---|---|---|---|---|---|---|---|
| 2016 | Georgia | 13 | 12 | 204 | 370 | 55.2 | 2,430 | 16 | 8 | 120.3 | 33 | −45 | −1.4 | 1 |
| 2017 | Georgia | 3 | 1 | 4 | 7 | 57.1 | 28 | 0 | 0 | 90.7 | 3 | −12 | −4.0 | 0 |
| 2019 | Washington | 13 | 13 | 260 | 405 | 64.2 | 3,132 | 23 | 8 | 143.9 | 19 | 3 | 0.2 | 0 |
| Total | | 29 | 26 | 468 | 782 | 59.8 | 5,590 | 39 | 16 | 132.3 | 55 | -54 | -1.0 | 1 |
