= Cavalero, Washington =

- CDP
- Location of Cavalero, Washington.
- Coordinates: 47°59′3″N 122°4′32″W
- Country: United States
- State: Washington
- County: Snohomish

Area
  - Total: 1.64 sq mi (4.24 km^{2})
  - Land: 1.64 sq mi (4.24 km^{2})
  - Water: 0.0012 sq mi (0.003 km^{2})

Population (2010)
  - Total: 4,660
  - Density: 2,845/sq mi (1,098.4/km^{2})
- Time zone: UTC-8 (Pacific (PST))
  - Summer (DST): UTC-7 (PDT)
- ZIP code: 98258
- Area code: 425
- GNIS feature ID: 2584956

Cavalero (also named Cavelero) is a census-designated place (CDP) in Snohomish County, Washington, United States. As of the 2020 census, Cavalero had a population of 5,232. Cavalero was created out of the former West Lake Stevens CDP in 2010.

== History ==
Prior to its residential development in the 2000s, the Cavalero Hill area was proposed for the site of a large retail center similar to Frontier Village in Lake Stevens.

== Geography ==
Cavalero is located at 47°59′3″N 122°4′32″W (47.984288, -122.075542).

According to the United States Census Bureau, the CDP has a total area of 1.639 square miles (4.24 km^{2}), of which, 1.638 square miles (4.24 km^{2}) of it is land and 0.001 square miles (0.003 km^{2}) of it (0.06%) is water.

== Demographics ==
Historical population
Census	Pop.	Note	%±
2010	4,660		—
2020	5,232		12.3%
U.S. Decennial Census; 2000 2010

Cavalero first appeared as a census designated place in the 2010 U.S. census formed from part of deleted West Lake Stevens CDP and additional area.

=== Racial and ethnic composition ===
Cavalero CDP, Washington – Racial and ethnic composition Note: the US Census treats Hispanic/Latino as an ethnic category. This table excludes Latinos from the racial categories and assigns them to a separate category. Hispanics/Latinos may be of any race.
Race / Ethnicity (NH = Non-Hispanic)	Pop 2010	Pop 2020	% 2010	% 2020
White alone (NH)	4,060	3,978	87.12%	76.03%
Black or African American alone (NH)	48	63	1.03%	1.20%
Native American or Alaska Native alone (NH)	32	21	0.69%	0.40%
Asian alone (NH)	132	212	2.83%	4.05%
Native Hawaiian or Pacific Islander alone (NH)	8	31	0.17%	0.59%
Other race alone (NH)	6	30	0.13%	0.57%
Mixed race or Multiracial (NH)	132	475	2.83%	9.08%
Hispanic or Latino (any race)	242	422	5.19%	8.07%
Total	4,660	5,232	100.00%	100.00%
