= Smokey Point, Washington =

- CDP
- Location of Smokey Point, Washington
- Coordinates: 48°8′45″N 122°11′41″W
- Country: United States
- State: Washington
- County: Snohomish

Area
  - Total: 2.7 sq mi (6.9 km^{2})
  - Land: 2.6 sq mi (6.8 km^{2})
  - Water: 0.039 sq mi (0.1 km^{2})
- Elevation: 125 ft (38 m)

Population (2000)
  - Total: 1,556
  - Density: 594/sq mi (229.3/km^{2})
- Time zone: UTC-8 (Pacific (PST))
  - Summer (DST): UTC-7 (PDT)
- ZIP Codes: 98223, 98271
- Area code: 360, 564
- FIPS code: 53-64995
- GNIS feature ID: 1512665

Smokey Point is a community and former census-designated place in northern Snohomish County, Washington. The area, developed as a suburban bedroom community in the late 20th century, was annexed into the nearby cities of Arlington and Marysville in the 1990s and 2000s.

== History ==
Smokey Point was settled in the early 20th century and was originally known as “Hild’s Corner”, then later referred to as Rex's Corner, named in the 1930s after Rex and Mabel Zeek, the owners of a restaurant located at U.S. Route 99 and Lakewood Road (present-day Smokey Point Boulevard and 172nd Street NE, respective). The restaurant was sold to Eric and Pearl Shurstad in October 1946, who renovated it to a barbecue restaurant and renamed it the "Smokey Point Café". U.S. Route 99 was bypassed by Interstate 5 in the late 1960s, constructing an interchange at Smokey Point and creating the Gissberg Ponds (now Twin Lakes) out of a gravel excavation site.

In 1966, the area was proposed as the location of a four-year public college, with 645 acres (261 ha) offered by the city of Arlington. The state legislature decided to build the college instead in Olympia, becoming The Evergreen State College.

By 1977, the population of the unincorporated area between Arlington and Marysville, including Smokey Point, had increased to 16,000 people as the result of suburban development. The area's first supermarket opened in 1978 alongside an office park and motel. In 1979, the Snohomish County Sheriff's Office established a precinct in Smokey Point at an existing fire station. Smokey Point's largest retail center, a 15-store strip mall with a Safeway, opened in 1991.

By the early 1990s, Smokey Point was rezoned to support industrial development to offset a regional shortage of affordable land for industrial use. After the opening of a new naval base in Everett in 1994, the U.S. Navy selected Smokey Point to house a support complex with a commissary, offices and a college. The 52-acre (21 ha) support complex broke ground in 1993 and opened in 1995.

The Puget Sound Regional Council explored the expansion of Arlington Municipal Airport into a regional airport in the 1990s to relieve Seattle–Tacoma International Airport, but decided instead to build a third runway at Sea-Tac because of existing traffic and local opposition. In September 2004, Marysville won a bid to build a 850-acre (340 ha) NASCAR racetrack (to be operated by the International Speedway Corporation) south of Smokey Point. The project was cancelled two months later after concerns about traffic impacts, environmental conditions, and $70 million in required transportation improvements arose. The NASCAR site was later pitched as a candidate for a new University of Washington satellite campus (known as UW North Sound) in the late 2000s, competing with downtown Everett, before the project was put on hold in 2008 and cancelled in 2011.

=== Annexation dispute ===
In the early 1990s, after a controversial land-use was proposed for the area, several property owners began an effort to petition the City of Arlington to annex a large portion of the Smokey Point community. Around the same time, another group of property owners began an effort to annex much of the same territory into the City of Marysville. The group working on annexing into Arlington was able to reach the required 60% assessed value threshold first, enabling their annexation to move forward.

The City of Marysville, having a vested interest by being the sewer and water utility provider for the area and having an interest in annexing Smokey Point, challenged the annexation, along with the residential community whose property was added to the annexation boundaries by the state Boundary Review Board for Snohomish County.

At that time, there was a single Arlington-Smokey Point-Marysville Urban Growth Boundary, causing confusion as to what city could potentially annex which area of Smokey Point. After many meetings with Snohomish County officials, the two cities ended up with separate urban growth boundaries for future annexation. Arlington was given the northeast portion of Smokey Point; Marysville was given the western and southern portions. However, when this proposal was presented to the local community, there was overwhelming opposition, as the community desired to have their entire community be annexed into one city, not split between two. The County Council had the final say and approved the territory divisions.

To further complicate things, there was a little-known state law on the books that would have transitioned the annexed territory from the Lakewood School District that served Smokey Point to the school district of the annexing city. Being that nearly all of the commercial area of Smokey Point was petitioned to be annexed into Arlington, the loss of such a tax base would have been devastating to the Lakewood School District. Local residents in Smokey Point and Lakewood also circulated petitions to incorporate the area as a separate city to preserve the school district's taxing base.

Because of these issues, local residents in the area formed a group called Save Our Community and Schools (SOCS). SOCS worked tirelessly with their local state representatives to change the law to protect the Lakewood School District. Those efforts were successful, and the Lakewood School District remains intact today.

After receiving much input from the local community with the desire to keep their community intact, SOCS filed a Notice of Intent for Incorporation, which would create the City of Smokey Point-Lakewood. The proposal was put on hold, however, since state law mandated that incorporations cannot occur while an annexation involving land in the same area is still pending.

After years of controversial court battles, lawsuits, redrawn boundaries, and strong opposition by the residential community, the annexation question was finally resolved in 1999, when the City of Arlington annexed the northeast portion of Smokey Point. The actual land annexed was but a small percentage of the originally-petitioned area, due to the redrawn urban growth boundaries. As a result of the annexation, the effort to keep the Smokey Point community intact ended, along with the hopes of incorporation. As expected, in the years since then, the southern and western portions of Smokey Point have been annexed into the City of Marysville.

=== Commercial growth ===
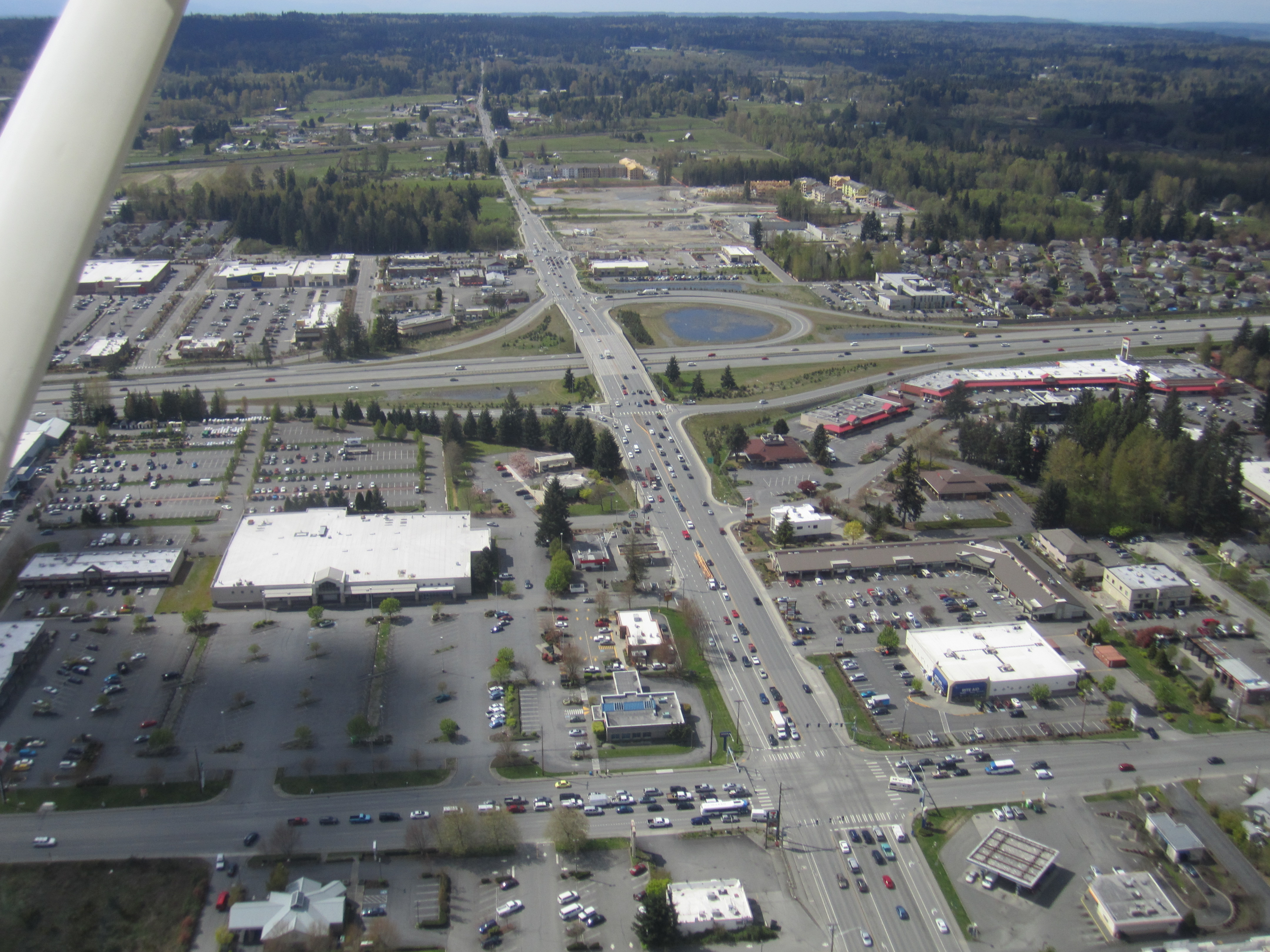
Aerial view of Smokey Point, looking west along 172nd Street

There has been substantial commercial growth in Smokey Point. The western side of Smokey Point (within the City of Marysville) has received much of this growth. In late 2006, the commercial area called "Lakewood Crossing" opened, just west of the Interstate 5 exit to Smokey Point (exit 206).

A stretch of Smokey Point Boulevard was developed into an auto row in the late 2010s, with several car dealerships relocating from Marysville. Plans for a major industrial center in the neighborhood were formed in the 1990s and 2000s by the cities of Arlington and Marysville. The Cascade Industrial Center was established in 2019 and designates 4,000 acres (1,600 ha) near Smokey Point for industrial and manufacturing uses. Several industrial warehouses were constructed in the early 2020s, including an Amazon distribution center, a Tesla warehouse, and a Frito-Lay distribution center.

== Geography ==
Smokey Point is located at 48°8′45″N 122°11′41″W (48.145708, -122.194794).

According to the United States Census Bureau, the CDP had a total area of 6.9 km^{2} (2.7 sq mi). 6.8 km^{2} (2.6 sq mi) of it is land and 0.1 km^{2} (0.039 sq mi) of it (1.13%) is water.

== Demographics ==
Historical population
Census	Pop.	Note	%±
1990	2,620		—
2000	1,556		−40.6%

As of the census of 2000, there were 1,556 people, 628 households, and 425 families residing in the CDP. The population density was 229.3 people/km^{2} (594 people/mi^{2}). There were 649 housing units at an average density of 95.6 units/km^{2} (248 units/mi^{2}). The racial makeup of the CDP was 87.15% White, 1.41% African American, 0.77% Native American, 4.82% Asian, 0.32% Pacific Islander, 1.35% from other races, and 4.18% from two or more races. Hispanic or Latino of any race were 5.78% of the population.

There were 628 households, out of which 32.2% had children under the age of 18 living with them, 58.1% were married couples living together, 6.2% had a female householder with no husband present, and 32.3% were non-families. 25.0% of all households were made up of individuals, and 11.3% had someone living alone who was 65 years of age or older. The average household size was 2.48 and the average family size was 2.99.

In the CDP, the age distribution of the population shows 25.4% under the age of 18, 7.0% from 18 to 24, 30.7% from 25 to 44, 20.2% from 45 to 64, and 16.7% who were 65 years of age or older. The median age was 37 years. For every 100 females, there were 99.5 males. For every 100 females age 18 and over, there were 97.1 males.

The median income for a household in the CDP was $46,202, and the median income for a family was $53,828. Males had a median income of $37,614 versus $30,250 for females. The per capita income for the CDP was $20,133. None of the families and 4.1% of the population were living below the poverty line, including no under eighteens and 10.3% of those over 64.

== Infrastructure ==
=== Transportation ===
There are several main arterials that pass through Smokey Point: Interstate 5, Smokey Point Boulevard, State Route 531 (also called 172nd Street NE), and 51st Avenue NE.

=== Healthcare ===
The nearest hospital is Cascade Valley Hospital in Arlington. Smokey Point has several clinics and specialty medical facilities that opened in the 2010s and 2020s. The Everett Clinic opened a two-story clinic and hub in 2012 that includes primary care, gynecology, orthopedics, cardiology, pediatrics, advance imaging, and laboratory services. A behavioral hospital with 115 beds opened in 2017.

== Sports ==
The stadium at Lakewood High School is home to Snohomish County FC Steelheads, a semi-pro soccer team.
