= Lake Goodwin, Washington =

- former CDP
- Location of Lake Goodwin, Washington
- Coordinates: 48°8′33″N 122°17′5″W
- Country: United States
- State: Washington
- County: Snohomish

Area
  - Total: 5.3 sq mi (13.6 km^{2})
  - Land: 4.0 sq mi (10.3 km^{2})
  - Water: 1.3 sq mi (3.3 km^{2})
- Elevation: 482 ft (147 m)

Population (2000)
  - Total: 3,354
  - Density: 841/sq mi (324.7/km^{2})
- Time zone: UTC-8 (Pacific (PST))
  - Summer (DST): UTC-7 (PDT)
- FIPS code: 53-37287
- GNIS feature ID: 1867616

Lake Goodwin is a former census-designated place (CDP) in Snohomish County, Washington, United States. The population was 3,354 at the 2000 census. The CDP was discontinued at the 2010 census.

Based on per capita income, one of the more reliable measures of affluence, Lake Goodwin ranks 58th of 522 areas in the state of Washington to be ranked.

== Geography ==
Lake Goodwin is located at 48°8′33″N 122°17′5″W (48.142455, -122.284668).

According to the United States Census Bureau, the CDP has a total area of 5.3 square miles (13.6 km^{2}), of which, 4.0 square miles (10.3 km^{2}) of it is land and 1.3 square miles (3.3 km^{2}) of it (24.14%) is water.

== Demographics ==
As of the census of 2000, there were 3,354 people, 1,236 households, and 940 families residing in the CDP. The population density was 840.9 people per square mile (324.6/km^{2}). There were 1,472 housing units at an average density of 369.0/sq mi (142.4/km^{2}). The racial makeup of the CDP was 94.60% White, 0.48% African American, 1.34% Native American, 0.72% Asian, 0.09% Pacific Islander, 0.86% from other races, and 1.91% from two or more races. Hispanic or Latino of any race were 2.44% of the population.

There were 1,236 households, out of which 36.6% had children under the age of 18 living with them, 67.2% were married couples living together, 5.7% had a female householder with no husband present, and 23.9% were non-families. 17.6% of all households were made up of individuals, and 4.4% had someone living alone who was 65 years of age or older. The average household size was 2.71 and the average family size was 3.10.

In the CDP, the age distribution of the population shows 27.3% under the age of 18, 6.1% from 18 to 24, 32.1% from 25 to 44, 26.6% from 45 to 64, and 7.8% who were 65 years of age or older. The median age was 38 years. For every 100 females, there were 106.1 males. For every 100 females age 18 and over, there were 106.0 males.

The median income for a household in the CDP was $65,044, and the median income for a family was $67,346. Males had a median income of $47,400 versus $31,597 for females. The per capita income for the CDP was $27,332. About 0.7% of families and 1.2% of the population were below the poverty line, including 1.5% of those under age 18 and none of those age 65 or over.

== Education ==
Most of it is in the Lakewood School District. The southern part is in the Marysville School District.
