= List of census-designated places in Washington =

The following is a complete list of the 360 populated places in the U.S. state of Washington delineated as census-designated places (CDPs) by the United States Census. CDPs are unincorporated communities lacking elected municipal officers and boundaries with legal status. The term "census designated place" has been used as an official classification by the U.S. Census Bureau since 1980. Prior to that, select unincorporated communities were surveyed in the U.S. Census. These include unincorporated villages, groups of villages, commercial developments, and Air Force Bases. Population data are included in the list.

== Census designated places in Washington ==
| CDP Name | County | Population (2020) | Population (2010) | Population (2000) | Population (1990) | Population (1980) | Notes | Land area | | Latitude Longitude |
| CDP Name | County | Population (2020) | Population (2010) | Population (2000) | Population (1990) | Population (1980) | Notes | sqmi | km^{2} | Latitude Longitude |
|---|---|---|---|---|---|---|---|---|---|---|
| Aberdeen Gardens | Grays Harbor | 279 | 279 | 227 | — | — | | 1.62 | 4.2 | 47°03′26″N 123°46′40″W |
| Acme | Whatcom | 229 | 246 | 263 | — | — | | 6.14 | 15.9 | 48°43′11″N 122°14′19″W |
| Addy | Stevens | 210 | 268 | — | — | — | | 0.35 | 0.91 | 48°21′32″N 117°50′14″W |
| Ahtanum | Yakima | 4,046 | 3,601 | 4,181 | — | — | | 7.70 | 19.9 | 46°33′29″N 120°36′20″W |
| Alder | Pierce | 212 | 227 | — | — | — | | 3.21 | 8.3 | 46°47′16″N 122°15′58″W |
| Alderton | Pierce | 3,274 | 2,893 | — | — | — | | 5.32 | 13.8 | 47°10′16″N 122°13′11″W |
| Alderwood Manor | Snohomish | 10,198 | 8,442 | 15,329 | 22,945 | 16,524 | Listed as Alderwood Manor-Bothell North in the 1980 and 1990 censuses | 1.95 | 5.1 | 47°48′52″N 122°16′04″W |
| Alger | Skagit | 507 | 403 | 89 | — | — | | 2.61 | 6.8 | 48°36′39″N 122°19′48″W |
| Allyn | Mason | 2,194 | 1,963 | — | — | — | Formed from part of deleted Allyn-Grapeview CDP | 1.58 | 4.1 | 47°23′07″N 122°50′30″W |
| Altoona | Wahkiakum | 56 | 39 | — | — | — | | 5.09 | 13.2 | 46°16′12″N 123°36′54″W |
| Amanda Park | Grays Harbor | 162 | 252 | — | — | — | | 8.22 | 21.3 | 47°27′14″N 123°55′31″W |
| Amboy | Clark | 1,800 | 1,608 | 2,085 | — | — | | 9.99 | 25.9 | 45°54′57″N 122°29′20″W |
| Ames Lake | King | 1,524 | 1486 | 1435 | — | — | | 1.60 | 4.1 | 47°38′02″N 121°57′38″W |
| Anatone | Asotin | 25 | — | — | — | — | | | | 46°08′08″N 117°07′57″W |
| Anderson Island | Pierce | 1,302 | 1,037 | — | — | — | | 7.74 | 20.0 | 47°09′00″N 122°40′54″W |
| Arlington Heights | Snohomish | 2,477 | 2,284 | 2,510 | — | — | | 8.40 | 21.8 | 48°12′43″N 122°03′47″W |
| Artondale | Pierce | 13,641 | | 8,630 | 7,141 | — | | 13.59 | 35.2 | 47°18′13″N 122°39′09″W |
| Ashford | Pierce | 303 | 217 | 267 | — | — | | 2.03 | 5.3 | 46°45′05″N 122°01′13″W |
| Bangor Base | Kitsap | 5,482 | | 7,253 | 3,702 | — | Listed as Bangor Trident Base in the 1990 and 2000 census | 11.11 | 28.8 | 47°43′20″N 122°42′51″W |
| Banks Lake South | Grant | 234 | 174 | 160 | — | — | | 2.44 | 6.3 | 47°37′48″N 119°16′28″W |
| Barberton | Clark | 8,567 | 5,661 | 4,647 | — | — | | 4.32 | 11.2 | 45°42′49″N 122°36′41″W |
| Baring | King | 255 | 220 | 233 | — | — | | 1.04 | 2.7 | 47°46′07″N 121°28′55″W |
| Barney's Junction | Ferry | 114 | 146 | — | — | — | | 0.26 | 0.67 | 48°37′13″N 118°07′44″W |
| Barstow | Ferry | 66 | 59 | — | — | — | | 0.56 | 1.5 | 48°46′42″N 118°07′58″W |
| Basin City | Franklin | 1,063 | 1,092 | 968 | — | — | | 3.19 | 8.3 | 46°35′21″N 119°09′24″W |
| Bay Center | Pacific | 253 | 276 | 174 | — | — | | 0.94 | 2.4 | 46°37′15″N 123°57′11″W |
| Bay View | Skagit | 812 | 696 | 334 | — | — | | 2.60 | 6.7 | 48°29′13″N 122°27′45″W |
| Beacon Hill | Cowlitz | 2,211 | — | — | — | — | | 1.19 | 3.1 | 46°10′37″N 122°55′25″W |
| Belfair | Mason | 4,279 | 3,931 | — | — | — | | 7.35 | 19.0 | 47°26′56″N 122°50′57″W |
| Bell Hill | Clallam | 875 | 837 | 731 | — | — | | 2.65 | 6.9 | 48°03′18″N 123°05′13″W |
| Bethel | Kitsap | 4,073 | 3,713 | — | — | — | | 3.18 | 8.2 | 47°29′15″N 122°37′03″W |
| Beverly | Grant | 266 | — | — | — | — | | | | 46°50′05″N 119°55′49″W |
| Bickleton | Klickitat | 92 | 88 | 113 | — | — | | 4.69 | 12.1 | 46°00′20″N 120°18′29″W |
| Big Lake | Skagit | 2,980 | 1,835 | 1,153 | — | — | | 3.77 | 9.8 | 48°22′59″N 122°13′34″W |
| Birch Bay | Whatcom | 10,115 | | 4,961 | 2,656 | — | | 16.01 | 41.5 | 48°53′47″N 122°44′18″W |
| Blyn | Clallam | 108 | 101 | 162 | — | — | | 4.74 | 12.3 | 48°00′35″N 122°58′50″W |
| Bothell East | Snohomish | 13,970 | 8,018 | — | — | — | Formed from part of deleted North Creek CDP | 2.08 | 5.4 | 47°48′23″N 122°11′04″W |
| Bothell West | Snohomish | 22,015 | 16,607 | — | — | — | Formed from part of Alderwood Manor CDP and deleted North Creek CDP | 4.22 | 10.9 | 47°48′19″N 122°14′27″W |
| Boulevard Park | King | 4,094 | 5,287 | — | — | — | Formed from part of deleted Riverton-Boulevard Park CDP | 1.21 | 3.1 | 47°30′48″N 122°18′53″W |
| Bow | Skagit | 303 | — | — | — | — | | | | 48°33′41″N 122°24′28″W |
| Boyds | Ferry | 34 | 34 | — | — | — | | 0.20 | 0.52 | 48°43′28″N 118°07′56″W |
| Brady | Grays Harbor | 692 | 676 | 645 | — | — | | 6.11 | 15.8 | 47°00′17″N 123°32′31″W |
| Brinnon | Jefferson | 907 | 797 | 803 | — | — | | 9.61 | 24.9 | 47°40′07″N 122°55′00″W |
| Browns Point | Pierce | 1,263 | 1,198 | — | — | — | | 0.40 | 1.0 | 47°18′15″N 122°26′12″W |
| Brush Prairie | Clark | 2,749 | 2,652 | 2,384 | 2,650 | — | | 7.69 | 19.9 | 45°43′30″N 122°32′54″W |
| Bryant | Snohomish | 2,128 | 1,870 | — | — | — | | 6.14 | 15.9 | 48°14′50″N 122°10′37″W |
| Bryn Mawr-Skyway | King | 17,397 | | 13,977 | 12,514 | 11,754 | | 2.84 | 7.4 | 47°29′38″N 122°14′39″W |
| Buena | Yakima | 1,048 | 990 | — | — | — | | 0.68 | 1.8 | 46°25′48″N 120°19′03″W |
| Bunk Foss | Snohomish | 3,680 | 3,570 | — | — | — | Formed from part of deleted West Lake Stevens CDP and additional area | 3.87 | 10.0 | 47°57′42″N 122°05′40″W |
| Burbank | Walla Walla | 3,499 | 3,291 | 3,303 | 1,745 | — | | 13.18 | 34.1 | 46°11′31″N 118°58′43″W |
| Burley | Kitsap | 2,081 | 2,057 | — | — | — | | 4.76 | 12.3 | 47°24′57″N 122°38′41″W |
| Camano | Island | 17,356 | x | 13,347 | — | — | Deleted for the 2010 U.S. census | 39.76 | 103.0 | 48°09′09″N 122°27′44″W |
| Canterwood | Pierce | 3,572 | 3,079 | — | — | — | | 2.17 | 5.6 | 47°22′35″N 122°36′08″W |
| Canyon Creek | Snohomish | 3,445 | | 2,326 | — | — | Listed as Jordan Road-Canyon Creek in the 2000 U.S. census | 6.11 | 15.8 | 48°06′36″N 121°58′57″W |
| Carlsborg | Clallam | 1,100 | 995 | 855 | — | — | | 1.06 | 2.7 | 48°05′03″N 123°10′11″W |
| Carson | Skamania | 2,323 | | 2,116 | 1,678 | — | Listed as Carson River Valley CDP in the 1990 and 2000 censuses | 4.79 | 12.4 | 45°44′09″N 121°49′57″W |
| Cascade Valley | Grant | 4,332 | | 1,811 | 1,288 | — | | 2.96 | 7.7 | 47°08′28″N 119°19′42″W |
| Cathcart | Snohomish | 2,647 | 2,458 | 3,015 | — | — | | 3.86 | 10.0 | 47°51′09″N 122°06′21″W |
| Cavalero | Snohomish | 5,232 | 4,660 | — | — | — | Formed from part of deleted West Lake Stevens CDP and additional area | 1.64 | 4.2 | 47°59′04″N 122°04′32″W |
| Centerville | Klickitat | 94 | 112 | 120 | — | — | | 3.32 | 8.6 | 45°45′14″N 120°54′29″W |
| Central Park | Grays Harbor | 2,841 | | 2,558 | 2,669 | 2,709 | | 3.52 | 9.1 | 46°58′19″N 123°42′08″W |
| Chain Lake | Snohomish | 4,806 | 3,741 | — | — | — | | 10.55 | 27.3 | 47°54′08″N 121°59′14″W |
| Chelan Falls | Chelan | 340 | 329 | — | — | — | | 0.28 | 0.73 | 47°47′58″N 119°59′18″W |
| Cherry Grove | Clark | 588 | 546 | 663 | — | — | | 2.44 | 6.3 | 45°48′07″N 122°34′35″W |
| Chico | Kitsap | 2,723 | 2,259 | — | — | — | | 2.29 | 5.9 | 47°37′24″N 122°43′11″W |
| Chinook | Pacific | 457 | 466 | 457 | — | — | | 1.01 | 2.6 | 46°16′32″N 123°56′32″W |
| Clallam Bay | Clallam | 386 | 363 | — | — | — | | 0.57 | 1.5 | 48°15′13″N 124°15′28″W |
| Clarkston Heights-Vineland | Asotin | 7,275 | | 6,117 | 2,832 | — | | 6.03 | 15.6 | 46°23′15″N 117°04′59″W |
| Clayton | Stevens | 420 | 443 | — | — | — | | 1.29 | 3.3 | 48°00′04″N 117°33′40″W |
| Clear Lake (Pierce County) | Pierce | 1,578 | 1,419 | — | — | — | | 8.48 | 22.0 | 46°55′42″N 122°18′18″W |
| Clear Lake (Skagit County) | Skagit | 1,228 | 1,002 | 942 | — | — | | 1.90 | 4.9 | 48°27′07″N 122°14′59″W |
| Clearview | Snohomish | 3,648 | 3,324 | — | — | — | Formed from parts of Cathcart CDP and Maltby CDP and parts of deleted North Creek CDP and Seattle Hill-Silver Firs CDP | 4.64 | 12.0 | 47°49′45″N 122°08′43″W |
| Cliffdell | Yakima | 114 | 104 | — | — | — | | 1.75 | 4.5 | 46°55′17″N 121°02′32″W |
| Clinton | Island | 956 | | 868 | 1,564 | — | | 1.01 | 2.6 | 47°57′45″N 122°21′08″W |
| Clover Creek | Pierce | 7,161 | 6,522 | — | — | — | | 6.47 | 16.8 | 47°08′36″N 122°22′50″W |
| Cohassett Beach | Grays Harbor | 771 | 722 | 618 | — | — | | 1.29 | 3.3 | 46°51′53″N 124°06′22″W |
| Conway | Skagit | 87 | 91 | 84 | — | — | | 0.23 | 0.60 | 48°20′08″N 122°20′40″W |
| Copalis Beach | Grays Harbor | 447 | 415 | 489 | — | — | | 3.66 | 9.5 | 47°07′51″N 124°10′17″W |
| Cottage Lake | King | 22,857 | 22,494 | 24,330 | — | — | includes part of deleted Woodinville CDP | 22.66 | 58.7 | 47°44′47″N 122°04′34″W |
| Cougar | Cowlitz | 118 | — | — | — | — | | | | 46°03′05″N 122°17′58″W |
| Country Homes | Spokane | 6,251 | | 5,203 | 5,126 | — | | 1.65 | 4.3 | 47°44′52″N 117°25′11″W |
| Cowiche | Yakima | 535 | 428 | — | — | — | | 0.52 | 1.3 | 46°40′22″N 120°42′55″W |
| Crescent Bar | Grant | 325 | — | — | — | — | | 1.88 | 4.9 | 47°12′30″N 119°59′58″W |
| Crocker | Pierce | 1,450 | 1,268 | — | — | — | | 7.16 | 18.5 | 47°05′01″N 122°06′45″W |
| Curlew | Ferry | 105 | 118 | — | — | — | | 0.76 | 2.0 | 48°52′40″N 118°36′16″W |
| Curlew Lake | Ferry | 512 | 462 | — | — | — | | 4.36 | 11.3 | 48°43′59″N 118°40′06″W |
| Custer | Whatcom | 518 | 366 | 299 | — | — | | 1.82 | 4.7 | 48°54′52″N 122°38′23″W |
| Dallesport | Klickitat | 1,328 | 1,202 | 1,185 | — | — | | 6.73 | 17.4 | 45°37′54″N 121°10′08″W |
| Danville | Ferry | 51 | 34 | — | — | — | | 0.18 | 0.47 | 48°59′37″N 118°30′25″W |
| Dash Point | Pierce | 963 | 931 | — | — | — | | 0.64 | 1.7 | 47°18′46″N 122°24′50″W |
| Deep River | Wahkiakum | 217 | 204 | — | — | — | | 13.31 | 34.5 | 46°21′13″N 123°42′17″W |
| Deming | Whatcom | 339 | 353 | 210 | — | — | | 5.20 | 13.5 | 48°50′39″N 122°13′32″W |
| Desert Aire | Grant | 2,288 | 1,626 | 1,124 | — | — | | 3.40 | 8.8 | 46°41′39″N 119°55′45″W |
| Disautel | Okanogan | 47 | 78 | — | — | — | | 3.77 | 9.8 | 48°20′42″N 119°13′48″W |
| Dixie | Walla Walla | 225 | 197 | 220 | — | — | | 0.54 | 1.4 | 46°08′21″N 118°08′52″W |
| Dollars Corner | Clark | 1,264 | 1,108 | 1,039 | — | — | | 3.96 | 10.3 | 45°46′49″N 122°36′00″W |
| Donald | Yakima | 172 | 91 | — | — | — | | 0.92 | 2.4 | 46°28′25″N 120°23′32″W |
| Duluth | Clark | 1,718 | 1,544 | — | — | — | | 5.97 | 15.5 | 45°47′02″N 122°38′49″W |
| East Cathlamet | Wahkiakum | 578 | 491 | 491 | — | — | | 1.71 | 4.4 | 46°11′48″N 123°21′29″W |
| East Port Orchard | Kitsap | 5,262 | | 5,116 | 5,409 | 4,631 | | 1.54 | 4.0 | 47°31′09″N 122°37′06″W |
| East Renton Highlands | King | 11,937 | | 13,264 | 13,218 | 11,695 | | 11.22 | 29.1 | 47°28′26″N 122°05′19″W |
| Eastmont | Snohomish | 24,059 | 20,101 | — | — | — | Formed from part of deleted Seattle Hill-Silver Firs CDP | 5.10 | 13.2 | 47°53′51″N 122°10′54″W |
| Easton | Kittitas | 407 | 478 | 383 | — | — | | 3.21 | 8.3 | 47°13′58″N 121°09′34″W |
| Edison | Skagit | 240 | 133 | 133 | — | — | | 0.57 | 1.5 | 48°33′37″N 122°25′52″W |
| Elbe | Pierce | 39 | 29 | 21 | — | — | | 0.06 | 0.16 | 46°45′55″N 122°11′41″W |
| Elk Plain | Pierce | 14,534 | | 15,697 | 12,197 | — | | 7.69 | 19.9 | 47°02′40″N 122°21′56″W |
| Enetai | Kitsap | 2,497 | 2,286 | — | — | — | | 1.03 | 2.7 | 47°35′18″N 122°36′21″W |
| Erlands Point | Kitsap | 916 | — | — | — | — | | 1.75 | 4.5 | 47°35′51″N 122°42′10″W |
| Eschbach | Yakima | 441 | 415 | 400 | — | — | | 1.18 | 3.1 | 46°39′54″N 120°37′57″W |
| Esperance | Snohomish | 4,007 | | 3,503 | 11,236 | 11,120 | | 0.72 | 1.9 | 47°47′36″N 122°20′57″W |
| Fairchild Air Force Base | Spokane | 2,695 | | 4,357 | 4,854 | 5,353 | | 6.53 | 16.9 | 47°37′08″N 117°38′53″W |
| Fairwood (King County) | King | 19,396 | 19,102 | — | — | — | | 4.73 | 12.3 | 47°26′48″N 122°08′35″W |
| Fairwood (Spokane County) | Spokane | 10,541 | | 6,764 | 5,807 | 5,337 | | 3.59 | 9.3 | 47°46′01″N 117°25′01″W |
| Fall City | King | 2,032 | | 1,638 | 1,582 | 1,528 | | 2.83 | 7.3 | 47°34′10″N 121°54′49″W |
| Felida | Clark | 9,526 | 7,385 | 5,683 | 3,109 | — | | 2.88 | 7.5 | 45°42′52″N 122°42′46″W |
| Fern Prairie | Clark | 2,061 | 1,884 | — | — | — | | 5.02 | 13.0 | 45°38′13″N 122°23′47″W |
| Fife Heights | Pierce | 1,882 | 2,137 | — | — | — | | 1.19 | 3.1 | 47°15′31″N 122°20′43″W |
| Finley | Benton | 6,152 | | 5,770 | 4,897 | — | | 11.56 | 29.9 | 46°10′10″N 119°02′41″W |
| Five Corners | Clark | 20,973 | 18,189 | 12,207 | 6,776 | — | | 5.90 | 15.3 | 45°41′22″N 122°34′14″W |
| Fobes Hill | Snohomish | 2,628 | 2,418 | — | — | — | Formed from part of deleted Northwest Snohomish CDP and additional area | 4.65 | 12.0 | 47°56′21″N 122°08′03″W |
| Fords Prairie | Lewis | 2,234 | | 1,961 | 2,480 | 2,582 | | 3.76 | 9.7 | 46°44′57″N 123°00′13″W |
| Fort Lewis | Pierce | 14,052 | | 19,089 | 22,224 | 23,761 | | 10.27 | 26.6 | 47°05′44″N 122°34′03″W |
| Four Lakes | Spokane | 537 | 512 | — | — | — | | 3.38 | 8.8 | 47°33′45″N 117°34′45″W |
| Fox Island | Pierce | 3,921 | | 2,803 | 2,017 | — | | 5.22 | 13.5 | 47°15′08″N 122°37′43″W |
| Frederickson | Pierce | 24,906 | | 5,758 | 3,502 | — | | 11.55 | 29.9 | 47°05′31″N 122°21′34″W |
| Freeland | Island | 2,252 | | 1,313 | 1,278 | — | | 3.88 | 10.0 | 48°01′42″N 122°32′59″W |
| Garrett | Walla Walla | 1,771 | | 1,022 | 1,044 | 1,134 | | 1.92 | 5.0 | 46°03′48″N 118°23′11″W |
| Geneva | Whatcom | 2,652 | 2,321 | 2,257 | — | — | | 1.06 | 2.7 | 48°44′41″N 122°24′24″W |
| Glacier | Whatcom | 300 | 211 | 90 | — | — | | 2.95 | 7.6 | 48°53′31″N 121°55′55″W |
| Gleed | Yakima | 2,873 | 2,906 | 2,947 | — | — | | 5.41 | 14.0 | 46°39′34″N 120°36′09″W |
| Glenwood | Klickitat | 179 | — | — | — | — | | | | 46°01′22″N 121°17′33″W |
| Gorst | Kitsap | 605 | 592 | — | — | — | | 0.61 | 1.6 | 47°31′26″N 122°42′20″W |
| Graham | Pierce | 32,658 | 23,491 | 8,739 | — | — | | 34.99 | 90.6 | 47°02′04″N 122°16′37″W |
| Grand Mound | Thurston | 3,301 | | 1,948 | 1,394 | — | | 3.93 | 10.2 | 46°48′22″N 123°00′48″W |
| Grapeview | Mason | 991 | 954 | — | — | — | Formed from part of deleted Allyn-Grapeview CDP | 3.67 | 9.5 | 47°20′05″N 122°50′00″W |
| Grayland | Grays Harbor | 847 | 953 | 1,002 | — | — | | 6.84 | 17.7 | 46°50′30″N 124°05′28″W |
| Grays River | Wahkiakum | 248 | 263 | — | — | — | | 20.13 | 52.1 | 46°22′04″N 123°34′53″W |
| Green Bluff | Spokane | 697 | 761 | — | — | — | | 7.64 | 19.8 | 47°49′08″N 117°16′37″W |
| Greenwater | Pierce | 95 | 67 | 91 | — | — | | 1.45 | 3.8 | 47°08′39″N 121°37′42″W |
| Hansville | Kitsap | 3,410 | 3,091 | — | — | — | | 10.60 | 27.5 | 47°54′36″N 122°34′16″W |
| Hat Island | Snohomish | 91 | 41 | — | — | — | | 0.69 | 1.8 | 48°00′48″N 122°19′14″W |
| Hazel Dell | Clark | 23,569 | 19,435 | — | — | — | Formed from merger of Hazel Dell North CDP and Hazel Dell South CDP | 4.84 | 12.5 | 45°40′55″N 122°39′10″W |
| Herron Island | Pierce | 150 | 151 | — | — | — | | 0.48 | 1.2 | 47°15′53″N 122°50′05″W |
| High Bridge | Snohomish | 3,140 | 2,994 | — | — | — | Formed from deleted Echo Lake CDP and additional area | 7.00 | 18.1 | 47°47′57″N 122°01′26″W |
| Hobart | King | 6,767 | 6,221 | 6,251 | — | — | includes most of deleted Maple Valley CDP | 18.80 | 48.7 | 47°24′42″N 122°00′19″W |
| Hockinson | Clark | 6,105 | 4,771 | 5,136 | — | — | | 13.78 | 35.7 | 45°43′49″N 122°29′00″W |
| Hogans Corner | Grays Harbor | 86 | 85 | — | — | — | | 0.31 | 0.80 | 47°02′29″N 124°09′42″W |
| Home | Pierce | 1,543 | 1,377 | — | — | — | | 6.32 | 16.4 | 47°16′29″N 122°47′24″W |
| Hoodsport | Mason | 419 | 376 | — | — | — | | 1.05 | 2.7 | 47°24′07″N 123°09′15″W |
| Humptulips | Grays Harbor | 236 | 255 | 216 | — | — | | 9.32 | 24.1 | 47°14′01″N 123°58′50″W |
| Inchelium | Ferry | 431 | | 389 | 393 | — | | 26.43 | 68.5 | 48°21′34″N 118°14′32″W |
| Indianola | Kitsap | 3,664 | | 3,026 | 1,729 | — | | 4.83 | 12.5 | 47°45′19″N 122°30′41″W |
| Jamestown | Clallam | 412 | 361 | — | — | — | | 0.58 | 1.5 | 48°07′22″N 123°05′28″W |
| Kapowsin | Pierce | 372 | 333 | — | — | — | | 4.12 | 10.7 | 46°58′24″N 122°13′52″W |
| Kayak Point | Snohomish | 1,883 | — | — | — | — | | 5.47 | 14.2 | 48°08′33″N 122°20′32″W |
| Keller | Ferry | 229 | 234 | — | — | — | | 9.52 | 24.7 | 48°05′07″N 118°42′59″W |
| Kendall | Whatcom | 769 | 191 | 158 | — | — | | 0.81 | 2.1 | 48°54′54″N 122°08′26″W |
| Ketron Island | Pierce | 20 | 17 | — | — | — | | 0.35 | 0.91 | 47°09′23″N 122°38′03″W |
| Key Center | Pierce | 3,863 | 3,692 | — | — | — | | 14.58 | 37.8 | 47°19′50″N 122°45′18″W |
| Keyport | Kitsap | 576 | 554 | — | — | — | | 0.51 | 1.3 | 47°42′00″N 122°37′27″W |
| Kingston | Kitsap | 2,515 | | 1,611 | 1,270 | — | | 1.87 | 4.8 | 47°48′04″N 122°29′56″W |
| Kitsap Lake | Kitsap | 1,997 | — | — | — | — | | 1.93 | 5.0 | 47°34′10″N 122°00′30″W |
| Klickitat | Klickitat | 320 | 362 | 417 | — | — | | 0.94 | 2.4 | 45°49′05″N 121°09′45″W |
| La Grande | Pierce | 121 | 109 | — | — | — | | 4.25 | 11.0 | 46°48′39″N 122°17′00″W |
| Lake Bosworth | Snohomish | 868 | 667 | 204 | — | — | | 3.41 | 8.8 | 48°03′09″N 121°59′19″W |
| Lake Cassidy | Snohomish | 3,757 | 3,415 | — | — | — | Formed from part of North Marysville CDP and additional area | 10.57 | 27.4 | 48°03′58″N 122°04′57″W |
| Lake Cavanaugh | Skagit | 200 | 167 | 122 | — | — | | 0.77 | 2.0 | 48°19′01″N 122°00′38″W |
| Lake Goodwin | Snohomish | 4,462 | | 3,354 | 2,437 | — | | 4.00 | 10.4 | 48°08′39″N 122°16′37″W |
| Lake Holm | King | 3,430 | 3,221 | — | — | — | | 8.36 | 21.7 | 47°18′23″N 122°07′48″W |
| Lake Ketchum | Snohomish | 1,268 | 930 | 1,173 | — | — | | 2.08 | 5.4 | 48°17′06″N 122°20′46″W |
| Lake Marcel-Stillwater | King | 1,334 | 1,277 | 1,381 | — | — | | 1.28 | 3.3 | 47°41′42″N 121°54′54″W |
| Lake McMurray | Skagit | 382 | 192 | 200 | — | — | | 0.81 | 2.1 | 48°18′39″N 122°14′03″W |
| Lake Morton-Berrydale | King | 10,474 | 10,160 | 9,659 | — | — | includes part of deleted Covington-Sawyer Wilderness CDP. | 12.29 | 31.8 | 47°19′58″N 122°06′14″W |
| Lake Roesiger | Snohomish | 611 | 503 | 652 | — | — | | 3.91 | 10.1 | 47°58′35″N 121°54′18″W |
| Lake Shore | Clark | 7,056 | 6,571 | 6,670 | 6,268 | — | | 1.64 | 4.2 | 45°41′28″N 122°41′28″W |
| Lake Stickney | Snohomish | 15,413 | 7,777 | — | — | — | Formed from parts of deleted Paine Field-Lake Stickney CDP and Picnic Point-North Lynnwood CDP | 1.53 | 4.0 | 47°52′17″N 122°15′26″W |
| Lake Tapps | Pierce | 12,962 | 11,859 | — | — | — | | 12.40 | 32.1 | 47°13′51″N 122°10′16″W |
| Lakeland North | King | 13,663 | | 15,085 | 14,402 | 11,648 | | 3.25 | 8.4 | 47°20′14″N 122°16′57″W |
| Lakeland South | King | 13,169 | | 11,436 | 9,027 | 5,225 | | 4.97 | 12.9 | 47°16′34″N 122°17′05″W |
| Lakeview | Grant | 1,068 | 915 | 797 | — | — | | 1.13 | 2.9 | 47°22′32″N 119°30′15″W |
| Larch Way | Snohomish | 4,993 | 3,318 | — | — | — | Formed from part of Martha Lake CDP and part of deleted Picnic Point-North Lynnwood CDP | 1.11 | 2.9 | 47°50′34″N 122°15′10″W |
| Laurier | Ferry | 4 | 1 | — | — | — | | 0.06 | 0.16 | 48°59′50″N 118°13′29″W |
| Lebam | Pacific | 150 | 160 | 176 | — | — | | 1.46 | 3.8 | 46°33′51″N 123°33′03″W |
| Lexington | Cowlitz | 3,834 | — | — | — | — | | 1.432 | 3.71 | 46°11′22″N 122°54′45″W |
| Lewisville | Clark | 1,860 | 1,722 | 1,688 | — | — | | 5.61 | 14.5 | 45°48′59″N 122°30′30″W |
| Lochsloy | Snohomish | 2,806 | 2,533 | 2,135 | — | — | | 7.46 | 19.3 | 48°03′35″N 122°02′28″W |
| Lofall | Kitsap | 2,211 | 2,289 | — | — | — | | 2.00 | 5.2 | 47°48′38″N 122°39′07″W |
| Longbranch | Pierce | 4,141 | 3,784 | — | — | — | | 20.01 | 51.8 | 47°13′34″N 122°46′01″W |
| Longview Heights | Cowlitz | 4,033 | | 3,513 | 3,310 | — | | 4.20 | 10.9 | 46°10′46″N 122°57′10″W |
| Loomis | Okanogan | 161 | 159 | — | — | — | | 0.87 | 2.3 | 48°49′25″N 119°38′23″W |
| Loon Lake | Stevens | 898 | 783 | — | — | — | | 3.26 | 8.4 | 48°04′07″N 117°37′47″W |
| Lower Elochoman | Wahkiakum | 275 | 185 | — | — | — | | 1.51 | 3.9 | 46°13′07″N 123°22′11″W |
| Lyle | Klickitat | 518 | 499 | 530 | — | — | | 0.71 | 1.8 | 45°41′44″N 121°16′50″W |
| Machias | Snohomish | 1,264 | 1,178 | 1,015 | — | — | | 2.45 | 6.3 | 47°59′30″N 122°03′06″W |
| Malo | Ferry | 32 | 28 | — | — | — | | 0.12 | 0.31 | 48°47′59″N 118°36′43″W |
| Malone | Grays Harbor | 468 | 475 | — | — | — | Formed from part of deleted Malone-Porter CDP | 9.04 | 23.4 | 46°58′28″N 123°18′27″W |
| Malott | Okanogan | 464 | 487 | — | — | — | | 1.84 | 4.8 | 48°17′31″N 119°41′44″W |
| Maltby | Snohomish | 11,277 | 10,830 | 8,267 | — | — | | 19.38 | 50.2 | 47°48′08″N 122°06′22″W |
| Manchester | Kitsap | 5,714 | | 4,958 | 4,031 | — | | 2.93 | 7.6 | 47°32′50″N 122°32′28″W |
| Manson | Chelan | 1,523 | 1,468 | — | — | — | | 1.25 | 3.2 | 47°53′09″N 120°09′23″W |
| Maple Falls | Whatcom | 291 | 324 | 277 | — | — | | 2.48 | 6.4 | 48°54′42″N 122°06′39″W |
| Maple Heights-Lake Desire | King | 3,873 | 3,152 | 2,569 | — | — | | 4.10 | 10.6 | 47°26′10″N 122°05′40″W |
| Maplewood | Pierce | 5,469 | 5,138 | — | — | — | | 8.29 | 21.5 | 47°22′35″N 122°33′56″W |
| Marblemount | Skagit | 286 | 203 | 251 | — | — | | 2.16 | 5.6 | 48°32′10″N 121°26′14″W |
| Marietta-Alderwood | Whatcom | 4,015 | | 3,594 | 2,766 | 2,324 | | 5.74 | 14.9 | 48°47′17″N 122°33′19″W |
| Marine View | Grant | 405 | — | — | — | — | | 0.9 | 2.3 | 46°57′49″N 119°21′03″W |
| Markham | Grays Harbor | 119 | 111 | 95 | — | — | | 1.12 | 2.9 | 46°54′51″N 123°59′17″W |
| Marrowstone | Jefferson | 995 | 844 | 837 | — | — | | 6.30 | 16.3 | 48°01′55″N 122°41′02″W |
| Martha Lake | Snohomish | 21,660 | | 12,633 | 10,155 | 7,022 | | 4.55 | 11.8 | 47°50′41″N 122°13′59″W |
| Maryhill | Klickitat | 55 | 58 | 98 | — | — | | 2.82 | 7.3 | 45°41′34″N 120°48′26″W |
| May Creek | Snohomish | 849 | 818 | 1,004 | — | — | | 0.62 | 1.6 | 47°51′20″N 121°40′27″W |
| McChord Air Force Base | Pierce | 3,188 | 2,507 | 4,096 | 4,538 | 5,746 | Listed as an unincorporated place in the 1970 U.S. census (pop 8,515) | 5.84 | 15.1 | 47°07′58″N 122°29′31″W |
| McKenna | Pierce | 678 | 716 | — | — | — | | 1.08 | 2.8 | 46°56′05″N 122°33′00″W |
| McMillin | Pierce | 1,624 | 1,547 | — | — | — | Formed from part of South Hill CDP | 1.65 | 4.3 | 47°07′34″N 122°14′07″W |
| Mead | Spokane | 7,576 | 7,275 | — | — | — | | 7.27 | 18.8 | 47°46′46″N 117°21′00″W |
| Meadow Glade | Clark | 2,758 | 2,541 | 2,225 | 1,584 | — | | 3.63 | 9.4 | 45°45′08″N 122°33′41″W |
| Meadowdale | Snohomish | 3,148 | 2,826 | — | — | — | Formed from part of deleted Picnic Point-North Lynnwood CDP | 1.08 | 2.8 | 47°51′30″N 122°18′58″W |
| Methow | Okanogan | 92 | 68 | — | — | — | | 0.68 | 1.8 | 48°07′52″N 120°00′19″W |
| Midland | Pierce | 9,962 | | 7,414 | 5,587 | — | | 3.04 | 7.9 | 47°10′24″N 122°24′43″W |
| Mill Creek East | Snohomish | 24,912 | 15,709 | — | — | — | Formed from parts of deleted North Creek CDP and Seattle Hill-Silver Firs CDP | 4.45 | 11.5 | 47°50′10″N 122°11′16″W |
| Mineral | Lewis | 193 | 202 | — | — | — | | 0.67 | 1.7 | 46°43′09″N 122°11′10″W |
| Minnehaha | Clark | 11,871 | 9,771 | 7,679 | 9,661 | — | | 2.22 | 5.7 | 45°39′23″N 122°37′04″W |
| Mirrormont | King | 3,858 | | 3,804 | 2,360 | — | | 10.38 | 26.9 | 47°27′37″N 121°59′25″W |
| Moclips | Grays Harbor | 211 | 207 | 615 | — | — | | 1.78 | 4.6 | 47°13′47″N 124°12′05″W |
| Monroe North | Snohomish | 1,796 | 1,666 | — | — | — | Formed from area detached from Monroe city and additional area | 2.44 | 6.3 | 47°52′57″N 121°59′17″W |
| Moses Lake North | Grant | 4,050 | | 4,232 | 3,677 | 3,348 | | 5.65 | 14.6 | 47°11′40″N 119°19′07″W |
| Mount Vista | Clark | 10,051 | 7,850 | 5,770 | — | — | | 5.24 | 13.6 | 45°44′14″N 122°37′54″W |
| Naselle | Pacific | 421 | 419 | 377 | — | — | | 2.27 | 5.9 | 46°22′14″N 123°46′54″W |
| Navy Yard City | Kitsap | 2,759 | | 2,638 | 2,905 | 2,594 | | 0.61 | 1.6 | 47°33′11″N 122°39′45″W |
| Neah Bay | Clallam | 935 | | 794 | 916 | — | | 2.35 | 6.1 | 48°21′40″N 124°36′42″W |
| Neilton | Grays Harbor | 299 | 315 | 345 | — | — | | 9.67 | 25.0 | 47°24′11″N 123°52′42″W |
| Nespelem Community | Okanogan | 283 | | 290 | 291 | — | | 23.49 | 60.8 | 48°09′45″N 119°02′55″W |
| Nile | Yakima | 146 | 140 | — | — | — | | 0.77 | 2.0 | 46°50′12″N 120°56′43″W |
| Nisqually Indian Community | Thurston | 668 | | 588 | 558 | — | | 2.75 | 7.1 | 47°01′33″N 122°41′22″W |
| North Fort Lewis | Pierce | 5,978 | 2,699 | — | — | — | Formed from part of Fort Lewis CDP | 5.90 | 15.3 | 47°07′17″N 122°35′40″W |
| North Lynnwood | Snohomish | 22,802 | 16,574 | — | — | — | Formed from part of deleted Picnic Point-North Lynnwood CDP | 3.12 | 8.1 | 47°51′12″N 122°16′34″W |
| North Omak | Okanogan | 651 | | 688 | 515 | — | | 11.20 | 29.0 | 48°26′38″N 119°26′45″W |
| North Puyallup | Pierce | 1,837 | 1,743 | — | — | — | | 1.02 | 2.6 | 47°11′56″N 122°16′42″W |
| North Sultan | Snohomish | 256 | 264 | 381 | — | — | | 0.59 | 1.5 | 47°52′57″N 121°49′22″W |
| North Yelm | Thurston | 3,140 | | 2,793 | 2,075 | — | | 3.34 | 8.7 | 46°57′58″N 122°36′48″W |
| Northwest Stanwood | Snohomish | 137 | 149 | — | — | — | Formed from part of deleted North Stanwood CDP | 0.70 | 1.8 | 48°15′45″N 122°21′00″W |
| Ocean City | Grays Harbor | 232 | 200 | 217 | — | — | | 3.34 | 8.7 | 47°04′57″N 124°09′25″W |
| Ocean Park | Pacific | 1,814 | | 1,459 | 1,409 | — | | 3.03 | 7.8 | 46°29′48″N 124°02′29″W |
| Ocosta | Grays Harbor | 502 | — | — | — | — | | | | |
| Onalaska | Lewis | 657 | 621 | — | — | — | | 1.59 | 4.1 | 46°34′42″N 122°42′40″W |
| Orchards | Clark | 27,729 | 19,556 | 17,852 | 19,435 | 8,828 | | 5.40 | 14.0 | 45°41′20″N 122°31′50″W |
| Orient | Ferry | 75 | 115 | — | — | — | | 0.43 | 1.1 | 48°51′50″N 118°12′21″W |
| Oso | Snohomish | 172 | 180 | 246 | — | — | | 2.83 | 7.3 | 48°17′15″N 121°55′30″W |
| Otis Orchards-East Farms | Spokane | 6,299 | | 6,318 | 5,811 | 4,597 | | 8.03 | 20.8 | 47°42′18″N 117°05′07″W |
| Outlook | Yakima | 317 | 292 | — | — | — | | 0.13 | 0.34 | 46°19′52″N 120°05′34″W |
| Oyehut | Grays Harbor | 79 | 85 | — | — | — | Formed from part of deleted Oyehut-Hogans CDP | 0.60 | 1.6 | 47°01′21″N 124°09′55″W |
| Pacific Beach | Grays Harbor | 280 | 291 | — | — | — | Formed from part of Moclips CDP | 1.21 | 3.1 | 47°13′04″N 124°11′37″W |
| Packwood | Lewis | 319 | 342 | — | — | — | | 1.00 | 2.6 | 46°36′31″N 121°40′13″W |
| Parker | Yakima | 158 | 154 | — | — | — | | 0.12 | 0.31 | 46°30′08″N 120°28′01″W |
| Parkland | Pierce | 38,623 | | 24,053 | 20,882 | 23,355 | | 8.64 | 22.4 | 47°08′29″N 122°26′16″W |
| Parkwood | Kitsap | 7,635 | | 7,213 | 6,853 | 4,599 | | 2.60 | 6.7 | 47°31′31″N 122°36′16″W |
| Pataha | Garfield | 106 | — | — | — | — | | | | |
| Peaceful Valley | Whatcom | 3,015 | 3,324 | 2,448 | — | — | | 16.96 | 43.9 | 48°56′32″N 122°08′27″W |
| Picnic Point | Snohomish | 9,768 | 8,809 | — | — | — | Formed from part of deleted Picnic Point-North Lynnwood CDP | 3.04 | 7.9 | 47°52′35″N 122°18′30″W |
| Pine Grove | Ferry | 129 | 145 | — | — | — | | 0.49 | 1.3 | 48°39′01″N 118°41′02″W |
| Point Roberts | Whatcom | 1,191 | 1,314 | — | — | — | | 4.89 | 12.7 | 48°59′05″N 123°03′34″W |
| Port Angeles East | Clallam | 3,159 | | 3,053 | 2,672 | 2,786 | | 3.77 | 9.8 | 48°06′35″N 123°22′02″W |
| Port Gamble Tribal Community | Kitsap | 1,010 | 916 | — | — | — | | 4.23 | 11.0 | 47°50′46″N 122°33′27″W |
| Port Hadlock-Irondale | Jefferson | 3,983 | | 3,476 | 2,742 | 1,752 | | 6.69 | 17.3 | 48°01′59″N 122°47′51″W |
| Port Ludlow | Jefferson | 2,959 | 2,603 | 1,968 | — | — | | 11.54 | 29.9 | 47°54′52″N 122°41′42″W |
| Porter | Grays Harbor | 204 | 207 | — | — | — | Formed from part of deleted Malone-Porter CDP and additional area | 8.88 | 23.0 | 46°56′55″N 123°16′49″W |
| Prairie Heights | Pierce | 4,561 | 4,405 | — | — | — | | 3.74 | 9.7 | 47°08′59″N 122°06′33″W |
| Prairie Ridge | Pierce | 12,288 | | 11,688 | 8,278 | — | | 4.09 | 10.6 | 47°08′40″N 122°08′21″W |
| Puget Island | Wahkiakum | 922 | 831 | — | — | — | | 7.57 | 19.6 | 46°10′32″N 123°22′55″W |
| Purdy | Pierce | 1,668 | 1,544 | — | — | — | | 2.34 | 6.1 | 47°23′47″N 122°36′17″W |
| Queets | Grays Harbor; Jefferson | 136 | 174 | — | — | — | | 1.40 | 3.6 | 47°31′35″N 124°20′41″W |
| Quilcene | Jefferson | 598 | 596 | 591 | — | — | | 8.81 | 22.8 | 47°50′21″N 122°54′44″W |
| Qui-nai-elt Village | Grays Harbor | 320 | 54 | — | — | — | | 0.74 | 1.9 | 47°15′01″N 124°11′25″W |
| Raft Island | Pierce | 490 | 459 | — | — | — | | 0.32 | 0.83 | 47°19′44″N 122°40′08″W |
| Ravensdale | King | 555 | 1,101 | 816 | — | — | | 4.45 | 11.5 | 47°21′23″N 121°57′44″W |
| River Road | Clallam | 495 | 454 | 450 | — | — | | 0.35 | 0.91 | 48°04′04″N 123°07′39″W |
| Riverbend | King | 2,123 | 2,132 | 2,230 | — | — | | 2.94 | 7.6 | 47°27′52″N 121°45′04″W |
| Riverpoint | King | 774 | 1,018 | 2,966 | — | — | First appeared as a CDP under the name Tanner in the 2000 U.S. census. The CDP was renamed to Riverpoint for the 2020 U.S. census. | 1.31 | 3.4 | 47°29′03″N 121°42′54″W |
| Roche Harbor | San Juan | 662 | — | — | — | — | | | | 48°36′37″N 123°07′40″W |
| Rochester | Thurston | 6,064 | | 1,829 | 1,250 | — | | 2.33 | 6.0 | 46°49′44″N 123°04′20″W |
| Rockport | Skagit | 90 | 109 | 102 | — | — | | 0.36 | 0.93 | 48°29′07″N 121°36′24″W |
| Rocky Point | Kitsap | 1,615 | 1,564 | — | — | — | | 0.74 | 1.9 | 47°35′18″N 122°40′07″W |
| Ronald | Kittitas | 439 | 308 | 265 | — | — | | 0.93 | 2.4 | 47°14′02″N 121°02′01″W |
| Roosevelt | Klickitat | 152 | 156 | 79 | — | — | | 3.79 | 9.8 | 45°43′59″N 120°14′12″W |
| Rosburg | Wahkiakum | 340 | 317 | — | — | — | | 22.91 | 59.3 | 46°18′29″N 123°38′36″W |
| Rosedale | Pierce | 4,357 | 4,044 | — | — | — | | 4.63 | 12.0 | 47°20′27″N 122°37′59″W |
| Ryderwood | Cowlitz | 383 | 395 | — | — | — | | 0.16 | 0.41 | 46°22′30″N 123°02′39″W |
| Salmon Creek | Clark | 21,293 | 19,686 | 16,767 | 11,989 | — | | 6.35 | 16.4 | 45°42′36″N 122°39′48″W |
| Santiago | Grays Harbor | 52 | 42 | — | — | — | | 1.57 | 4.1 | 47°17′56″N 124°13′55″W |
| Satsop | Grays Harbor | 696 | 675 | 619 | — | — | | 7.02 | 18.2 | 47°01′22″N 123°28′59″W |
| Schwana | Grant | 215 | — | — | — | — | | 0.26 | 0.67 | 46°49′17″N 119°55′24″W |
| Seabeck | Kitsap | 1,143 | 1,105 | — | — | — | | 3.32 | 8.6 | 47°38′39″N 122°49′05″W |
| Sekiu | Clallam | 24 | 27 | — | — | — | | 0.13 | 0.34 | 48°15′51″N 124°18′05″W |
| Shadow Lake | King | 2,396 | 2,262 | — | — | — | | 5.20 | 13.5 | 47°24′06″N 122°04′10″W |
| Silvana | Snohomish | 97 | 90 | 97 | — | — | | 1.51 | 3.9 | 48°12′06″N 122°14′46″W |
| Silver Firs | Snohomish | 22,174 | 20,891 | — | — | — | Formed from part of deleted Seattle Hill-Silver Firs CDP and additional area | 6.86 | 17.8 | 47°51′49″N 122°08′59″W |
| Silverdale | Kitsap | 20,733 | | 15,816 | 7,660 | — | | 12.63 | 32.7 | 47°40′04″N 122°40′55″W |
| Sisco Heights Lake Cassidy | Snohomish | 3,140 | 2,696 | — | — | — | Formed from part of North Marysville CDP and additional area | 12.53 | 32.5 | 48°07′08″N 122°06′27″W |
| Skamokawa Valley | Wahkiakum | 487 | 401 | — | — | — | | 28.19 | 73.0 | 46°18′55″N 123°24′05″W |
| Skokomish | Mason | 615 | | 616 | 532 | — | | 6.70 | 17.4 | 47°19′42″N 123°09′32″W |
| Snoqualmie Pass | Kittitas | 372 | 311 | 201 | — | — | | 2.93 | 7.6 | 47°24′05″N 121°24′40″W |
| South Creek | Pierce | 2,519 | 2,507 | — | — | — | | 7.73 | 20.0 | 47°00′03″N 122°23′27″W |
| South Hill | Pierce | 64,708 | | 31,623 | 12,963 | — | | 18.36 | 47.6 | 47°07′15″N 122°17′07″W |
| South Wenatchee | Chelan | 1,522 | | 1,991 | 1,207 | 1,376 | | 1.16 | 3.0 | 47°23′26″N 120°17′12″W |
| Southworth | Kitsap | 2,362 | 2,185 | — | — | — | | 3.38 | 8.8 | 47°30′50″N 122°31′56″W |
| Spanaway | Pierce | 35,476 | | 21,588 | 15,001 | 8,868 | | 8.77 | 22.7 | 47°05′53″N 122°25′24″W |
| Stansberry Lake | Pierce | 2,087 | 2,101 | — | — | — | | 2.08 | 5.4 | 47°22′58″N 122°42′43″W |
| Startup | Snohomish | 859 | 676 | 817 | — | — | | 4.10 | 10.6 | 47°52′01″N 121°44′59″W |
| Steptoe | Whitman | 160 | 180 | — | — | — | | 2.22 | 5.7 | 47°00′27″N 117°21′01″W |
| Sudden Valley | Whatcom | 6,354 | | 4,165 | 2,615 | — | | 6.25 | 16.2 | 48°43′12″N 122°20′54″W |
| Summit | Pierce | 8,270 | | 8,041 | 6,312 | — | | 5.12 | 13.3 | 47°10′10″N 122°21′49″W |
| Summit View | Pierce | 9,758 | 7,236 | — | — | — | Formed from part of South Hill CDP and additional area | 3.24 | 8.4 | 47°08′11″N 122°21′07″W |
| Summitview | Yakima | 2,066 | 967 | 900 | — | — | | 2.53 | 6.6 | 46°35′53″N 120°39′05″W |
| Suncrest | Stevens | 5,413 | — | — | — | — | | 9.86 | 25.5 | 47°48′53″N 117°34′36″W |
| Sunday Lake | Snohomish | 1,184 | 640 | — | — | — | | 1.73 | 4.5 | 48°13′49″N 122°16′04″W |
| Sunland Estates | Grant | 179 | — | — | — | — | | | | 47°04′27″N 120°01′42″W |
| Sunnyslope | Chelan | 4,041 | | 2,521 | 1,907 | 1,485 | | 9.56 | 24.8 | 47°28′56″N 120°20′32″W |
| Suquamish | Kitsap | 4,266 | | 3,510 | 3,105 | 1,498 | | 6.83 | 17.7 | 47°43′33″N 122°35′18″W |
| Swede Heaven | Snohomish | 839 | 768 | — | — | — | | 7.01 | 18.2 | 48°16′50″N 121°42′35″W |
| Taholah | Grays Harbor | 776 | | 824 | 788 | — | | 3.46 | 9.0 | 47°19′34″N 124°16′23″W |
| Tampico | Yakima | 467 | 312 | — | — | — | | 3.88 | 10.0 | 46°31′56″N 120°52′30″W |
| Tanglewilde | Thurston | 6,265 | 5,892 | 5,670 | 6,061 | 5,910 | First appeared as an unincorporated community in the 1970 U.S. census (pop 3,423). Name changed from Tanglewilde-Thompson Place CDP for the 2010 U.S. census | 1.44 | 3.7 | 47°03′04″N 122°46′51″W |
| Tehaleh | Pierce | 5,784 | — | — | — | — | | | | |
| Terrace Heights | Yakima | 9,244 | | 6,447 | 4,223 | 3,199 | | 8.00 | 20.7 | 46°36′10″N 120°26′57″W |
| Thorp | Kittitas | 232 | 240 | 273 | — | — | | 1.22 | 3.2 | 47°03′56″N 120°40′15″W |
| Three Lakes | Snohomish | 3,941 | 3,184 | 2,492 | — | — | | 11.67 | 30.2 | 47°57′19″N 121°58′43″W |
| Tokeland | Pacific | 158 | 151 | 194 | — | — | | 0.51 | 1.3 | 46°42′32″N 123°59′00″W |
| Torboy | Ferry | 43 | 49 | — | — | — | | 0.93 | 2.4 | 48°40′09″N 118°40′08″W |
| Touchet | Walla Walla | 425 | 421 | 396 | — | — | | 1.22 | 3.2 | 46°02′28″N 118°40′21″W |
| Town and Country | Spokane | 5,068 | | 4,452 | 4,921 | 5,578 | | 1.20 | 3.1 | 47°43′41″N 117°25′23″W |
| Tracyton | Kitsap | 5,967 | | 3,267 | 2,621 | 2,304 | | 1.92 | 5.0 | 47°36′34″N 122°39′11″W |
| Trout Lake | Klickitat | 672 | 557 | 494 | — | — | | 6.94 | 18.0 | 45°59′52″N 121°31′44″W |
| Twin Lakes | Ferry | 99 | 59 | — | — | — | | 4.17 | 10.8 | 48°15′44″N 118°21′33″W |
| Union | Mason | 683 | 631 | — | — | — | | 1.62 | 4.2 | 47°20′51″N 123°05′43″W |
| Union Hill-Novelty Hill | King | 22,683 | 18,805 | 11,265 | — | — | | 24.23 | 62.8 | 47°41′16″N 122°01′27″W |
| Upper Elochoman | Wahkiakum | 178 | 193 | — | — | — | | 1.45 | 3.8 | 46°14′25″N 123°19′28″W |
| Valley | Stevens | 149 | 146 | — | — | — | | 0.43 | 1.1 | 48°10′22″N 117°43′28″W |
| Vantage | Kittitas | 54 | 74 | 70 | — | — | | 0.33 | 0.85 | 46°56′43″N 119°59′32″W |
| Vashon | King | 11,055 | 10,624 | 10,123 | — | — | | 36.92 | 95.6 | 47°24′40″N 122°27′18″W |
| Vaughn | Pierce | 565 | 544 | — | — | — | | 2.30 | 6.0 | 47°21′29″N 122°46′57″W |
| Venersborg | Clark | 3,990 | 3,745 | 3,274 | — | — | | 10.83 | 28.0 | 45°47′10″N 122°28′19″W |
| Verlot | Snohomish | 340 | 285 | 170 | — | — | | 10.86 | 28.1 | 48°06′07″N 121°45′33″W |
| Walla Walla East | Walla Walla | 2,286 | | 2,479 | 2,959 | 3,285 | | 1.33 | 3.4 | 46°03′06″N 118°18′10″W |
| Waller | Pierce | 8,189 | | 9,200 | 6,415 | — | | 7.92 | 20.5 | 47°12′15″N 122°22′04″W |
| Wallula | Walla Walla | 140 | 179 | 197 | — | — | | 0.11 | 0.28 | 46°05′05″N 118°54′20″W |
| Warm Beach | Snohomish | 2,990 | 2,437 | 2,040 | — | — | | 4.07 | 10.5 | 48°09′54″N 122°20′52″W |
| Wauna | Pierce | 4,421 | 4,186 | — | — | — | | 6.38 | 16.5 | 47°22′59″N 122°40′10″W |
| West Clarkston-Highland | Asotin | 5,488 | | 4,707 | 3,913 | 3,683 | | 2.81 | 7.3 | 46°24′08″N 117°03′48″W |
| West Pasco | Franklin | 1,747 | | 4,629 | 7,312 | 5,726 | | 2.77 | 7.2 | 46°15′08″N 119°11′03″W |
| Wheeler | Grant | 74 | — | — | — | — | | 0.22 | 0.57 | 47°08′06″N 119°10′34″W |
| Whidbey Island Station | Island | 1,671 | 1,541 | 2,064 | 3,795 | 2,553 | Listed as Ault Field in the 2000, 1990, and 1980 census. First listed as an unincorporated place in the 1970 U.S. census (pop 1,478). | 6.62 | 17.1 | 48°20′56″N 122°39′13″W |
| White Center | King | 16,631 | | 20,975 | 20,531 | 19,362 | | 2.26 | 5.9 | 47°30′33″N 122°20′53″W |
| White Swan | Yakima | 789 | | 3,033 | 2,669 | — | | 2.67 | 6.9 | 46°22′37″N 120°44′17″W |
| Wilderness Rim | King | 1,617 | 1,523 | — | — | — | | 0.62 | 1.6 | 47°26′49″N 121°46′07″W |
| Willapa | Pacific | 208 | 210 | — | — | — | | 0.28 | 0.73 | 46°40′32″N 123°39′53″W |
| Wishram | Klickitat | 366 | | 324 | — | — | | 1.28 | 3.3 | 45°39′36″N 120°58′11″W |
| Wollochet | Pierce | 6,769 | 6,651 | — | — | — | | 5.84 | 15.1 | 47°16′58″N 122°34′38″W |
| Woods Creek | Snohomish | 6,017 | | 4,502 | — | — | | 14.03 | 36.3 | 47°52′39″N 121°54′09″W |

== Deleted census designated places ==
| CDP Name | County | Population (2020) | Population (2010) | Population (2000) | Population (1990) | Population (1980) | Notes |
|---|---|---|---|---|---|---|---|
| Covington-Sawyer Wilderness | King | — | — | — | 24,321 | — | Deleted. Part used to form the Lake Morton-Berrydale CDP with the remainder annexed to the cities of Black Diamond, Washington, and Maple Valley. |
| Mill Plain | Clark | — | — | 7,400 | — | — | Annexed to the city of Vancouver |
| Hazel Dell North | Clark | — | — | 9,261 | 6,924 | — | Merged with Hazel Dell South CDP to form of Hazel Dell CDP |
| Hazel Dell South | Clark | — | — | 6,605 | 5,796 | — | Merged with Hazel Dell North CDP to form of Hazel Dell CDP |
| Klahanie | King | — | 10,674 | — | — | — | Annexed to the city of Sammamish, Washington in 2016 |
| Maple Valley | King | — | — | — | 1,211 | — | Incorporated into the city of Maple Valley in 1997 with the remainder used to form the Hobart CDP |
| Woodinville | King | — | — | — | 7,479 | — | Part incorporated into the city of Woodinville, Washington and part used to form the CDP of Cottage Lake |
| Riverton | King | — | 6,407 | — | — | — | Annexed to the city of Burien, Washington in April 2010 |
| Walnut Grove | Clark | — | 9,790 | 7,164 | 3,926 | — | Incorporated into the city of Vancouver, Washington in 2017 |
| Dishman | Spokane | — | — | 10,031 | 9,671 | 10,169 | Incorporated into the city of Spokane Valley, Washington prior to the 2010 U.S. census Listed as an unincorporated community in the 1970 U.S. census (pop 9,079) |
| Opportunity | Spokane | — | — | 25,065 | 22,326 | 21,241 | Incorporated into the city of Spokane Valley, Washington prior to the 2010 U.S. census |
| Trentwood | Spokane | — | — | 4,388 | 4,060 | — | Incorporated into the city of Spokane Valley, Washington prior to the 2010 U.S. census |
| Veradale | Spokane | — | — | 9,387 | 7,836 | 7,256 | Incorporated into the city of Spokane Valley, Washington prior to the 2010 U.S. census |
| Green Acres | Spokane | — | — | 5,158 | 4,626 | — | Incorporated into the cities of Liberty Lake and Spokane Valley, Washington prior to the 2010 U.S. census |
| Oyehut-Hogans Corner | Grays Harbor | — | — | 188 | — | — | Split into the Hogans Corner CDP and Oyehut CDP |
| Echo Lake | Snohomish | — | — | 849 | — | — | Deleted and incorporated into the High Bridge CDP |
| North Stanwood | Snohomish | — | — | 468 | — | — | After the city of Stanwood annexed part of North Stanwood; the remaining area was designated as a new CDP under the name Northwest Stanwood CDP. |
| Northwest Snohomish | Snohomish | — | — | 2,061 | — | — | |
| Allyn-Grapeview | Mason | — | — | 2,004 | 1,526 | — | |
| Cascade-Fairwood | King | — | — | 34,580 | 30,107 | 16,939 | Annexed to Renton city |
| Cathan | Snohomish | — | — | 526 | 428 | — | |
| Chehalis Village | Grays Harbor | — | — | 346 | 282 | — | |
| Eastgate | King | — | 4,958 | 4,558 | 4,434 | 8,341 | Annexed to Bellevue city in 2012 |
| East Hill-Meridian, Washington | King | — | 29,878 | 29,308 | 42,696 | — | Annexed to Kent and Renton |
| East Wenatchee Bench | Douglas | — | — | 13,658 | 12,539 | 11,410 | annexed by East Wenatchee |
| Erlands Point-Kitsap Lake | Kitsap | — | 2,935 | 2,723 | 2,764 | — | Split into Erlands Point CDP and Kitsap Lake CDP |
| Greenacres | Spokane | — | — | 5,158 | 4,646 | — | split between the city of Spokane Valley and unincorporated Spokane County with a small portion being located within the city of Liberty Lake |
| Highland | Benton | — | — | 3,388 | 3,656 | — | part annexed to Kennewick city |
| Kingsgate | King | — | 13,065 | 12,222 | 14,259 | 12,652 | Annexed to the city of Kirkland |
| Inglewood-Finn Hill | King | — | 22,707 | 22,661 | 29,132 | — | Annexed to the city of Kirkland in 2011 |
| John Sam Lake | Snohomish | — | — | 753 | 432 | — | |
| Lea Hill | King | — | — | 10,871 | 6,876 | — | Annexed to the city of Auburn in 2008 |
| Liberty Lake | Spokane | — | — | 4,660 | 2,015 | 1,599 | Incorporated in 2001 |
| Paine Field-Lake Stickney | Snohomish | — | — | 24,383 | 18,670 | — | Deleted and incorporated into the Lake Stickney CDP along with the Picnic Point-North Lynnwood CDP |
| Picnic Point-North Lynnwood | Snohomish | — | — | 22,953 | — | — | Deleted and incorporated into the Lake Stickney CDP along with the Paine Field-Lake Stickney CDP |
| Priest Point | Snohomish | — | — | 779 | 703 | — | Deleted and incorporated into the Tulalip Indian Reservation |
| Riverton-Boulevard Park | King | — | — | 11,188 | 15,337 | — | Split into the Riverton CDP and the Boulevard Park CDP |
| Satus | Yakima | — | — | 746 | 1,343 | — | |
| Seattle Hill-Silver Firs | Snohomish | — | — | 35,311 | 24,474 | 10,299 | Territory allocated amongst Eastmont CDP, Mill Creek East CDP, Clearview CDP, and Silver Firs CDP |
| Shaker Church | Snohomish | — | — | 787 | 670 | — | |
| Smokey Point | Snohomish | — | — | 1,556 | 2,620 | — | Annexed by Arlington and Marysville |
| Stimson Crossing | Snohomish | — | — | 773 | 591 | — | |
| Tulalip Bay | Snohomish | — | — | 1,561 | 1,395 | — | Deleted and incorporated into the Tulalip Indian Reservation |
| Weallup Lake | Snohomish | — | — | 882 | 681 | — | |
| West Lake Sammamish | King | — | — | 5,937 | 6,087 | — | Annexed to Bellevue city in 2001 |
| West Lake Stevens | Snohomish | — | — | 18,071 | 12,453 | — | mostly annexed into the city of Lake Stevens with the remaining parts used to form the CDPs of Bunk Foss and Cavalero in 2010 |
| West Side Highway | Cowlitz | — | 5,517 | 4,565 | 3,641 | — | Split into Beacon Hill CDP and Lexington CDP |
| West Valley | Yakima | — | — | 10,433 | 6,594 | — | annexed to the city of Yakima |
| West Wenatchee | Chelan | — | — | 1,681 | 2,220 | 2,187 | mostly annexed to the city of Wenatchee; Listed as an unincorporated community in the 1950 U.S. census (pop 2,690), the 1960 U.S. census (pop 2,518), and the 1970 U.S. census (pop 2,134) |
| Junction City | Grays Harbor | — | 18 | 80 | — | — | Deleted prior to the 2020 U.S. census |
| North Marysville | Snohomish | — | 108 | 21,161 | 18,711 | 15,159 | The Sisco Heights CDP and the Lake Cassidy CDP were split off for the 2010 U.S. census. The CDP was deleted prior to the 2020 U.S. census |

== See also ==
- List of municipalities in Washington
- List of unincorporated communities in Washington
