= Washington's 1st congressional district =

U.S. House district for Washington

Coordinates: 47°50′N 122°24′W

- Interactive map of district boundaries since January 3, 2023
- Representative: Suzan DelBene; D–Medina
- Population (2025): 820,494
- Median household income: $135,918
- Ethnicity: 59.7% White; 19.7% Asian; 9.8% Hispanic; 6.6% Two or more races; 2.6% Black; 1.5% other
- Cook PVI: D+15

Washington's 1st congressional district encompasses parts of King and Snohomish counties. The district covers several cities in the north of the Seattle metropolitan area, east of Interstate 5, including parts of Bellevue, Marysville, and up north toward Arlington.

In presidential elections, the 1st district has leaned Democratic. Under current boundaries, Barack Obama swept the district in 2008 and 2012, with 60% of the vote each time. Hillary Clinton won the district with 59% in 2016, Joe Biden received 63% in the district in 2020, and Kamala Harris received 62% here in 2024.

== History ==
=== Pre-2012 ===
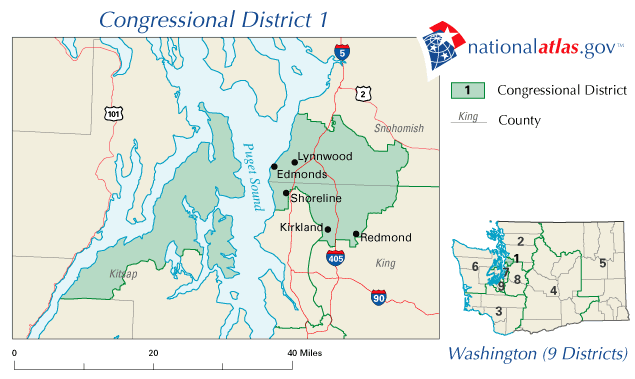
The district from 2003 to 2013

Prior to the 2012 redistricting, the district encompassed part of Northwest Seattle and largely suburban areas north and east of Seattle, including Shoreline, Edmonds, Lynnwood, Mountlake Terrace, Kenmore, Bothell, Kirkland, and Redmond, as well as Bainbridge Island and part of the Kitsap Peninsula. Until March 20, 2012, it was represented by Democrat Jay Inslee from Bainbridge Island. Inslee resigned to focus on his run for Governor of the state; the seat remained vacant until the special election that coincided with the November 2012 general election.

The former House seat of powerful U.S. Senator Warren G. Magnuson, the district was a swing district throughout much of the 1990s, changing hands and parties three times in four elections. Before the election of future U.S. Senator Maria Cantwell in 1992, the district had been in Republican hands for 40 years (and 42 of the previous 46 years). Since the 1998 election, when Inslee was first elected, the growing Democratic trend in the Seattle area enabled him to turn it into a fairly safe seat. He had been re-elected six times, with little difficulty, most recently in 2010.

=== Post-2012 ===
The district from 2013 to 2023

The 2012 redistricting drastically changed the 1st district. Much of this area was previously part of the 2nd district, but in the new map, the 2nd has shrunk significantly. Jay Inslee (D) was the representative of the 1st district until resigning to run for governor of the state, but most of the district has been represented by Rick Larsen (D), of the 2nd district, in the past.

Soon after the 2012 general election polls closed, the Seattle Times and national news organizations called the district for Democrat Suzan DelBene, defeating Republican John Koster with a margin that the Seattle Times called "unexpectedly decisive", reflecting the difficulty of predicting the vote in the new district. The certified results confirmed her significant margin. DelBene also won the election for the remainder of Inslee's term in the old first district, and after being sworn in on November 13, 2012.

== Recent election results from statewide races ==
Year	Office	Results
2008	President	Obama 60%–38%
2010	Senate	Murray 53%–47%
2012	President	Obama 60%–40%
2016	President	Clinton 59%–33%
2016	Senate	Murray 60%–40%
2016	Governor	Inslee 55%–45%
2016	Lt. Governor	Habib 58%–42%
2016	Secretary of State	Wyman 54%–46%
2016	Auditor	McCarthy 52%–48%
2018	Senate	Cantwell 62%–38%
2020	President	Biden 63%–33%
2020	Governor	Inslee 61%–38%
2020	Secretary of State	Wyman 52%–48%
2020	Treasurer	Pellicciotti 57%–43%
2020	Auditor	McCarthy 62%–38%
2020	Attorney General	Ferguson 60%–40%
2022	Senate	Murray 62%–37%
2022	Secretary of State (Spec.)	Hobbs 55%–41%
2024	President	Harris 62%–34%
2024	Senate	Cantwell 63%–37%
2024	Governor	Ferguson 59%–40%
2024	Lt. Governor	Heck 60%–40%
2024	Secretary of State	Hobbs 64%–36%
2024	Treasurer	Pellicciotti 61%–39%
2024	Auditor	McCarthy 62%–38%
2024	Attorney General	Brown 60%–40%
2024	Commissioner of Public Lands	Upthegrove 57%–43%

== Composition ==
For the 118th and successive Congresses (based on redistricting following the 2020 census), the district contains all or portions of the following counties and communities:

King County (12)

Bellevue (part; also 9th), Bothell (shared with Snohomish County), Clyde Hill, Cottage Lake (part; also 8th), Hunts Point, Kenmore, Kirkland, Medina, Redmond (part; also 8th), Union Hill-Novelty Hill (part; also 8th), Woodinville, Yarrow Point

Snohomish County (32)

Alderwood Manor, Arlington, Bothell (shared with King County), Bothell East, Bothell West, Brier, Bunk Foss, Cathcart, Cavalero, Chain Lake, Clearview, Eastmont, Fobes Hill, High Bridge, Lake Cassidy, Lake Stevens, Larch Way, Lochsloy, Machias, Maltby, Martha Lake, Marysville, Mill Creek, Mill Creek East, Monroe, Monroe North, Mountlake Terrace, North Lynwood (part; also 2nd), Silver Firs, Sisco Heights, Snohomish (part; also 8th), Three Lakes

== List of members representing the district ==
Beginning in 1909, members were elected from districted seats, instead of at-large statewide. (See Washington's at-large congressional district.)

Member	Party	Years	Cong ress	Electoral history	District location
District established March 4, 1909
William E. Humphrey (Seattle)	Republican	March 4, 1909 – March 3, 1917	61st 62nd 63rd 64th	Redistricted from the at-large district and re-elected in 1908. Re-elected in 1910. Re-elected in 1912. Re-elected in 1914. Retired to run for U.S. senator.	
John Franklin Miller (Seattle)	Republican	March 4, 1917 – March 3, 1931	65th 66th 67th 68th 69th 70th 71st	Elected in 1916. Re-elected in 1918. Re-elected in 1920. Re-elected in 1922. Re-elected in 1924. Re-elected in 1926. Re-elected in 1928. Lost renomination.	
Ralph Horr (Seattle)	Republican	March 4, 1931 – March 3, 1933	72nd	Elected in 1930. Lost renomination.	
Marion Zioncheck (Seattle)	Democratic	March 4, 1933 – August 7, 1936	73rd 74th	Elected in 1932. Re-elected in 1934. Died.	
Vacant		August 7, 1936 – January 3, 1937	74th		
Warren Magnuson (Seattle)	Democratic	January 3, 1937 – December 13, 1944	75th 76th 77th 78th	Elected in 1936. Re-elected in 1938. Re-elected in 1940. Re-elected in 1942. Retired to run for U.S. senator and resigned when elected.	
Vacant		December 13, 1944 – January 3, 1945	78th		
Hugh De Lacy (Seattle)	Democratic	January 3, 1945 – January 3, 1947	79th	Elected in 1944. Lost re-election.	
Homer Jones (Bremerton)	Republican	January 3, 1947 – January 3, 1949	80th	Elected in 1946. Lost re-election.	
Hugh Mitchell (Seattle)	Democratic	January 3, 1949 – January 3, 1953	81st 82nd	Elected in 1948. Re-elected in 1950. Retired to run for Governor of Washington.	
Thomas Pelly (Seattle)	Republican	January 3, 1953 – January 3, 1973	83rd 84th 85th 86th 87th 88th 89th 90th 91st 92nd	Elected in 1952. Re-elected in 1954. Re-elected in 1956. Re-elected in 1958. Re-elected in 1960. Re-elected in 1962. Re-elected in 1964. Re-elected in 1966. Re-elected in 1968. Re-elected in 1970. Retired.	
Joel Pritchard (Seattle)	Republican	January 3, 1973 – January 3, 1985	93rd 94th 95th 96th 97th 98th	Elected in 1972. Re-elected in 1974. Re-elected in 1976. Re-elected in 1978. Re-elected in 1980. Re-elected in 1982. Retired.	
John Miller (Seattle)	Republican	January 3, 1985 – January 3, 1993	99th 100th 101st 102nd	Elected in 1984. Re-elected in 1986. Re-elected in 1988. Re-elected in 1990. Retired.	
Maria Cantwell (Mountlake Terrace)	Democratic	January 3, 1993 – January 3, 1995	103rd	Elected in 1992. Lost re-election.	
Rick White (Bainbridge Island)	Republican	January 3, 1995 – January 3, 1999	104th 105th	Elected in 1994. Re-elected in 1996. Lost re-election.	
Jay Inslee (Bainbridge Island)	Democratic	January 3, 1999 – March 20, 2012	106th 107th 108th 109th 110th 111th 112th	Elected in 1998. Re-elected in 2000. Re-elected in 2002. Re-elected in 2004. Re-elected in 2006. Re-elected in 2008. Re-elected in 2010. Resigned to run for Governor of Washington.	
Jay Inslee (Bainbridge Island)	Democratic	January 3, 1999 – March 20, 2012	106th 107th 108th 109th 110th 111th 112th	Elected in 1998. Re-elected in 2000. Re-elected in 2002. Re-elected in 2004. Re-elected in 2006. Re-elected in 2008. Re-elected in 2010. Resigned to run for Governor of Washington.	2003–2013
Vacant		March 20, 2012 – November 6, 2012	112th		2003–2013
Suzan DelBene (Medina)	Democratic	November 6, 2012 – present	112th 113th 114th 115th 116th 117th 118th 119th	Elected to finish Inslee's term. Elected to full term in 2012. Re-elected in 2014. Re-elected in 2016. Re-elected in 2018. Re-elected in 2020. Re-elected in 2022. Re-elected in 2024. Re-elected in 2026.	2003–2013
Suzan DelBene (Medina)	Democratic	November 6, 2012 – present	112th 113th 114th 115th 116th 117th 118th 119th	Elected to finish Inslee's term. Elected to full term in 2012. Re-elected in 2014. Re-elected in 2016. Re-elected in 2018. Re-elected in 2020. Re-elected in 2022. Re-elected in 2024. Re-elected in 2026.	2013–2023
Suzan DelBene (Medina)	Democratic	November 6, 2012 – present	112th 113th 114th 115th 116th 117th 118th 119th	Elected to finish Inslee's term. Elected to full term in 2012. Re-elected in 2014. Re-elected in 2016. Re-elected in 2018. Re-elected in 2020. Re-elected in 2022. Re-elected in 2024. Re-elected in 2026.	2023–present

== Recent election results ==
=== 2010 ===
United States House of Representatives elections in Washington, 2010
Party	Candidate	Votes	%
Democratic	Jay Inslee (incumbent)	172,642	57.67
Republican	James Watkins	126,737	42.33
Total votes		299,379	100.0
Turnout			
Democratic hold			

=== 2012 short term (2010 boundaries) ===
United States House of Representatives elections in Washington, 2012 One Month Short Term
Party	Candidate	Votes	%
Democratic	Suzan DelBene	216,144	60.42
Republican	John Koster	141,591	39.58
Total votes		357,735	100.0
Turnout			
Democratic hold			

=== 2012 ===
United States House of Representatives elections in Washington, 2012
Party	Candidate	Votes	%
Democratic	Suzan DelBene (incumbent) (Note: DelBene was the incumbent by virtue of winning the simultaneous One Month Short Term election)	177,025	53.94
Republican	John Koster	151,187	46.06
Total votes		328,212	100.0
Turnout			
Democratic hold			

=== 2014 ===
Washington's 1st Congressional District - November 4, 2014
Party	Candidate	Votes	%
Democratic	Suzan DelBene (incumbent)	124,151	55.04
Republican	Pedro Celis	101,428	44.96
Total votes		225,579	100
Democratic hold			

=== 2016 ===
Washington's 1st Congressional District - November 8, 2016
Party	Candidate	Votes	%
Democratic	Suzan DelBene (incumbent)	193,619	55.42
Republican	Robert J. Sutherland	155,779	44.58
Total votes		349,398	100
Democratic hold			

=== 2018 ===
Washington's 1st Congressional District - November 6, 2018
Party	Candidate	Votes	%
Democratic	Suzan DelBene (incumbent)	197,209	59.27
Republican	Jeffrey Beeler	135,534	40.73
Total votes		332,743	100
Democratic hold			

=== 2020 ===
Washington's 1st Congressional District - November 3, 2020
Party	Candidate	Votes	%
Democratic	Suzan DelBene (incumbent)	249,944	58.6
Republican	Jeffrey Beeler	176,407	41.3
Write-in		511	0.1
Total votes		426,862	100.0
Democratic hold			

=== 2022 ===
Washington's 1st Congressional District - November 8, 2022
Party	Candidate	Votes	%
Democratic	Suzan DelBene (incumbent)	181,992	63.5
Republican	Vincent Cavaleri	104,329	36.4
Write-in		363	0.1
Total votes		286,684	100.0
Democratic hold			

=== 2024 ===
Washington's 1st Congressional District - November 5, 2024
Party	Candidate	Votes	%
Democratic	Suzan DelBene (incumbent)	227,213	63.0
Republican	Jeb Brewer	132,538	36.7
Write-in		907	0.3
Total votes		360,658	100.0
Democratic hold			

== See also ==
- 2008 United States House of Representatives elections in Washington
- 2010 United States House of Representatives elections in Washington
- 2012 United States House of Representatives elections in Washington
