= Raft Island =

Raft Island, Washington
- Unincorporated community Census designated place
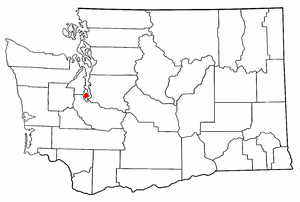
- Raft Island
- Interactive map of Raft Island, Washington
- Coordinates: 47°19′44.4″N 122°40′7.6″W
- Country: United States
- State: Washington
- County: Pierce

Area
  - Total: 0.315 sq mi (0.82 km^{2})
  - Land: 0.277 sq mi (0.72 km^{2})
  - Water: 0.038 sq mi (0.098 km^{2})
- Elevation: 144 ft (44 m)

Population (2020)
  - Total: 490
  - Density: 1,800/sq mi (680/km^{2})
- Time zone: UTC-8 (PST)
  - Summer (DST): UTC-7 (PDT)
- Area code(s): 360, 564
- FIPS code: 53-57140
- GNIS feature ID: 2585028

Raft Island is a private island and CDP located near the Pierce County community of Rosedale, Washington, United States. Gig Harbor, Washington is the nearest incorporated town, although unincorporated Artondale is much closer. The island features approximately 200 homes on 160 acres. All of these homes are served through the Gig Harbor post office.

Raft Island is privately managed by the Raft Island Improvement Association (an HOA) and its homeowner members. Raft Island contains private parks, private roads, private beaches, a private tennis court, a private boat launch, and a private church camp. The island is connected to the mainland by a 0.5 km (0.31 mi)-long bridge.

== Geography ==
Raft Island size varies between 160 and 201 acres (813,910 m²) in area depending on high or low tide, and is oval in shape. It is located in Henderson Bay within Puget Sound.

== History ==
Lieutenant Peter Puget of the Vancouver Expedition [led by Captain George Vancouver, arriving here in 1792] was the first recorded person that we know of to have landed on what we call today Raft Island. According to Edmond S. Meany, Raft Island was probably named from its appearance. In 1841 Charles Wilkes of the United States Exploring Expedition gave it the name "Allshouse Island", probably for Joseph Allshouse, a member of his crew.

- In 1889, the Stevens brothers claimed the entire island and they are recorded as its first settlers. F. Stevens held 27 acres on the western end of the island and his brother Jacob claimed the remaining 133 acres. Ownership, however, was recorded under Jacob Steven’s name and held by the brothers until 1900.
- In 1900, the Rosedale settlers started logging operations on the island.
- By 1915, the island was divided into 14 lots each with a different owner. None lived permanently on the island.
- In the 1920s, bootleggers used Raft Island for their operations.
- In 1928, George O. Noble, a wealthy mining engineer from California bought the island. He used it strictly as a recreational estate. He built a house and hired a caretaker on site which later became the Catholic Youth Organization (CYO) camp, the forerunner of All Saints Center. Noble was also responsible for bringing electricity to the island. The camp site and electricity were his major contributions and by 1932 he left the island for good.
- In 1942, Jess Kuhns purchased Raft Island for $30,000. He renamed the island Kuhns’ Raft Island and in 1946 created his own restrictions for all future residents. Those same restrictions were still in effect in 1998 with the exception of residency based upon race.
- In the mid 1950s, Kuhns decide to have an auction and sell the lots on the island. Norman and Eva Anderson bought one lot and the CYO bought 17 lots. Because the lots were selling for such low amounts, Kuhns decided to stop the auction and find a single buyer for all the remaining lots. The person who purchased those lots was Robert L. Healy of Tacoma and a group of associates.
- In March 1957, Healy sold his rights to the island and the bridge to Archie L. Matthew from Tacoma.
- In 1959, Matthew sold the island to Graham & Blodwyn McDonald and Merritt and Alta Parish for $348,000. They are responsible for the development of the water system and the roads on Raft Island. The McDonald and Parish families then founded what became the Raft Island Improvement Association to manage the island for the benefit of the homeowners.

== Demographics ==
Historical population
Census	Pop.	Note	%±
2010	459		—
2020	490		6.8%
U.S. Decennial Census; 2000 2010

Raft Island first appeared as a census designated place in the 2010 U.S. census.

=== Racial and ethnic composition ===
Raft Island CDP, Washington – Racial and ethnic composition Note: the US Census treats Hispanic/Latino as an ethnic category. This table excludes Latinos from the racial categories and assigns them to a separate category. Hispanics/Latinos may be of any race.
Race / Ethnicity (NH = Non-Hispanic)	Pop 2010	Pop 2020	% 2010	% 2020
White alone (NH)	422	417	91.94%	85.10%
Black or African American alone (NH)	5	5	1.09%	1.02%
Native American or Alaska Native alone (NH)	0	3	0.00%	0.61%
Asian alone (NH)	11	6	2.40%	1.22%
Native Hawaiian or Pacific Islander alone (NH)	0	0	0.00%	0.00%
Other race alone (NH)	4	2	0.87%	0.41%
Mixed race or Multiracial (NH)	9	29	1.96%	5.92%
Hispanic or Latino (any race)	8	28	1.74%	5.71%
Total	459	490	100.00%	100.00%
