= Prairie Ridge, Washington =

- CDP
- Location of Prairie Ridge, Washington
- Coordinates: 47°08′14″N 122°07′54″W
- Country: United States
- State: Washington
- County: Pierce

Area
  - Total: 4.3 sq mi (11.1 km^{2})
  - Land: 4.2 sq mi (11.0 km^{2})
  - Water: 0 sq mi (0.0 km^{2})
- Elevation: 650 ft (200 m)

Population (2020)
  - Total: 12,288
  - Density: 2,744/sq mi (1,059.4/km^{2})
- Time zone: UTC-8 (Pacific (PST))
  - Summer (DST): UTC-7 (PDT)
- ZIP code: 98391
- Area code: 253
- FIPS code: 53-56170
- GNIS feature ID: 2409102

Prairie Ridge is a census-designated place (CDP) in Pierce County, Washington, United States. The population was 12,288 at the 2020 census.

== Geography ==
According to the United States Census Bureau, the CDP has a total area of 4.3 square miles (11.1 km^{2}), of which, 4.3 square miles (11.0 km^{2}) of it is land and 0.23% is water.

== Demographics ==
Historical population
Census	Pop.	Note	%±
1990	8,278		—
2000	11,688		41.2%
2010	11,464		−1.9%
2020	12,288		7.2%
U.S. Decennial Census; 2020 Census

=== 2020 census ===
As of the 2020 census, Prairie Ridge had a population of 12,288. The median age was 37.3 years. 24.0% of residents were under the age of 18 and 11.1% of residents were 65 years of age or older. For every 100 females there were 106.4 males, and for every 100 females age 18 and over there were 105.9 males age 18 and over.

98.9% of residents lived in urban areas, while 1.1% lived in rural areas.

There were 4,296 households in Prairie Ridge, of which 35.7% had children under the age of 18 living in them. Of all households, 56.6% were married-couple households, 17.6% were households with a male householder and no spouse or partner present, and 16.3% were households with a female householder and no spouse or partner present. About 17.2% of all households were made up of individuals and 6.1% had someone living alone who was 65 years of age or older.

There were 4,406 housing units, of which 2.5% were vacant. The homeowner vacancy rate was 0.7% and the rental vacancy rate was 1.5%.

Racial composition as of the 2020 census
Race	Number	Percent
White	9,885	80.4%
Black or African American	152	1.2%
American Indian and Alaska Native	154	1.3%
Asian	191	1.6%
Native Hawaiian and Other Pacific Islander	70	0.6%
Some other race	478	3.9%
Two or more races	1,358	11.1%
Hispanic or Latino (of any race)	1,173	9.5%

=== 2000 census ===
As of the census of 2000, there were 11,688 people, 3,902 households, and 3,109 families living in the CDP. The population density was 2,743.9 people per square mile (1,059.3/km^{2}). There were 4,038 housing units at an average density of 948.0/sq mi (366.0/km^{2}). The racial makeup of the CDP was 93.38% White, 0.54% African American, 1.17% Native American, 0.91% Asian, 0.38% Pacific Islander, 0.79% from other races, and 2.84% from two or more races. Hispanic or Latino of any race were 3.36% of the population.

There were 3,902 households, out of which 47.3% had children under the age of 18 living with them, 64.4% were married couples living together, 9.3% had a female householder with no husband present, and 20.3% were non-families. 13.7% of all households were made up of individuals, and 3.4% had someone living alone who was 65 years of age or older. The average household size was 3.00 and the average family size was 3.29.

In the CDP, the age distribution of the population shows 33.2% under the age of 18, 6.3% from 18 to 24, 36.9% from 25 to 44, 17.8% from 45 to 64, and 5.8% who were 65 years of age or older. The median age was 32 years. For every 100 females, there were 103.0 males. For every 100 females age 18 and over, there were 101.8 males.

The median income for a household in the CDP was $52,367, and the median income for a family was $55,158. Males had a median income of $42,287 versus $29,121 for females. The per capita income for the CDP was $19,491. About 5.1% of families and 5.5% of the population were below the poverty line, including 6.6% of those under age 18 and 4.6% of those age 65 or over.
