= Summitview, Washington =

- CDP
- Location of Summitview, Washington
- Coordinates: 46°35′54″N 120°39′23″W
- Country: United States
- State: Washington
- County: Yakima

Area
  - Total: 2.6 sq mi (6.7 km^{2})
  - Land: 2.6 sq mi (6.7 km^{2})
  - Water: 0 sq mi (0.0 km^{2})
- Elevation: 1,355 ft (413 m)

Population (2010)
  - Total: 967
  - Density: 349/sq mi (134.6/km^{2})
- Time zone: UTC-8 (Pacific (PST))
  - Summer (DST): UTC-7 (PDT)
- ZIP code: 98908
- Area code: 509
- FIPS code: 53-68417
- GNIS feature ID: 2410021

Summitview is a census-designated place (CDP) in Yakima County, Washington, United States. The population was 2,066 at the 2020 census, a dramatic increase of 967 from the 2010 census.

Based on per capita income, Summitview ranks 18th of 522 areas in the state of Washington to be ranked. It is also the highest rank achieved in Yakima County.

== Geography ==
According to the United States Census Bureau, the CDP has a total area of 2.6 square miles (6.7 km^{2}), all of it land.

== Demographics ==
Historical population
Census	Pop.	Note	%±
2000	900		—
2010	967		7.4%
2020	2,066		113.7%
U.S. Decennial Census; 1970 1980 1990; 2000 2010

Summitview first appeared as a census designated place in the 2000 U.S. census.

=== Racial and ethnic composition ===
Summitview CDP, Washington – Racial and ethnic composition Note: the US Census treats Hispanic/Latino as an ethnic category. This table excludes Latinos from the racial categories and assigns them to a separate category. Hispanics/Latinos may be of any race.
Race / Ethnicity (NH = Non-Hispanic)	Pop 2000	Pop 2010	Pop 2020	% 2000	% 2010	% 2020
White alone (NH)	813	820	1,532	90.33%	84.80%	74.15%
Black or African American alone (NH)	0	5	13	0.00%	0.52%	0.63%
Native American or Alaska Native alone (NH)	3	6	10	0.33%	0.62%	0.48%
Asian alone (NH)	0	4	25	0.00%	0.41%	1.21%
Native Hawaiian or Pacific Islander alone (NH)	0	2	1	0.00%	0.21%	0.05%
Other race alone (NH)	0	1	30	0.00%	0.10%	1.45%
Mixed race or Multiracial (NH)	14	20	128	1.56%	2.07%	6.20%
Hispanic or Latino (any race)	70	109	327	7.78%	11.27%	15.83%
Total	900	967	2,066	100.00%	100.00%	100.00%

=== 2000 census ===
As of the census of 2000, there were 900 people, 294 households, and 256 families residing in the CDP. The population density was 348.6 people per square mile (134.7/km^{2}). There were 308 housing units at an average density of 119.3/sq mi (46.1/km^{2}). The racial makeup of the CDP was 94.33% White, 0.33% Native American, 0.22% Pacific Islander, 3.33% from other races, and 1.78% from two or more races. Hispanic or Latino of any race were 7.78% of the population.

There were 294 households, out of which 45.9% had children under the age of 18 living with them, 79.3% were married couples living together, 5.4% had a female householder with no husband present, and 12.9% were non-families. 9.9% of all households were made up of individuals, and 2.7% had someone living alone who was 65 years of age or older. The average household size was 3.06 and the average family size was 3.29.

In the CDP, the age distribution of the population shows 29.8% under the age of 18, 6.4% from 18 to 24, 27.0% from 25 to 44, 26.6% from 45 to 64, and 10.2% who were 65 years of age or older. The median age was 40 years. For every 100 females, there were 100.4 males. For every 100 females age 18 and over, there were 103.9 males.

The median income for a household in the CDP was $66,944, and the median income for a family was $67,083. Males had a median income of $48,036 versus $25,139 for females. The per capita income for the CDP was $36,301. About 2.8% of families and 2.6% of the population were below the poverty line, including none of those under age 18 and 11.5% of those age 65 or over.
