= Lake Stickney, Washington =

- CDP
- Location of Lake Stickney, Washington
- Coordinates: 47°52′17″N 122°15′26″W
- Country: United States
- State: Washington
- County: Snohomish

Area
  - Total: 1.6 sq mi (4.1 km^{2})
  - Land: 1.5 sq mi (4.0 km^{2})
  - Water: 0.039 sq mi (0.1 km^{2})

Population (2020)
  - Total: 15,413
  - Density: 10,000/sq mi (3,900/km^{2})
- Time zone: UTC-8 (Pacific (PST))
  - Summer (DST): UTC-7 (PDT)
- FIPS code: 53-52765

Lake Stickney is a census-designated place (CDP) in Snohomish County, Washington, United States. The population was 15,413 at the 2020 census. The CDP was known as Paine Field-Lake Stickney prior to 2010. The new Lake Stickney CDP no longer contains the Paine Field airport.

== Geography ==
Lake Stickney is located at 47°52′17″N 122°15′26″W (47.871429, -122.257204).

According to the United States Census Bureau, the CDP has a total area of 1.6 square miles (4.1 km^{2}), of which, 1.5 square miles (4.0 km^{2}) of it is land and 0.04 square miles (0.1 km^{2}) of it (2.43%) is water.

== Demographics ==
Historical population
Census	Pop.	Note	%±
2010	7,777		—
2020	15,413		98.2%
U.S. Decennial Census; 2000 2010

Lake Stickney first appeared as a census designated place in the 2010 U.S. census formed from parts of the deleted Paine Field-Lake Stickney and Picnic Point-North Lynnwood CDPs.

=== Racial and ethnic composition ===
Lake Stickney CDP, Washington – Racial and ethnic composition Note: the US Census treats Hispanic/Latino as an ethnic category. This table excludes Latinos from the racial categories and assigns them to a separate category. Hispanics/Latinos may be of any race.
Race / Ethnicity (NH = Non-Hispanic)	Pop 2010	Pop 2020	% 2010	% 2020
White alone (NH)	4,057	6,499	52.17%	42.17%
Black or African American alone (NH)	404	1,383	5.19%	8.97%
Native American or Alaska Native alone (NH)	75	61	0.96%	0.40%
Asian alone (NH)	1,802	3,934	23.17%	25.52%
Native Hawaiian or Pacific Islander alone (NH)	78	178	1.00%	1.15%
Other race alone (NH)	10	91	0.13%	0.59%
Mixed race or Multiracial (NH)	319	999	4.10%	6.48%
Hispanic or Latino (any race)	1,032	2,268	13.27%	14.71%
Total	7,777	15,413	100.00%	100.00%

=== 2020 census ===
As of the 2020 census, Lake Stickney had a population of 15,413. The median age was 34.9 years. 23.7% of residents were under the age of 18 and 11.2% of residents were 65 years of age or older. For every 100 females there were 99.6 males, and for every 100 females age 18 and over there were 97.2 males age 18 and over.

100.0% of residents lived in urban areas, while 0.0% lived in rural areas.

There were 5,734 households in Lake Stickney, of which 33.8% had children under the age of 18 living in them. Of all households, 44.9% were married-couple households, 21.1% were households with a male householder and no spouse or partner present, and 26.5% were households with a female householder and no spouse or partner present. About 27.2% of all households were made up of individuals and 9.5% had someone living alone who was 65 years of age or older.

There were 6,017 housing units, of which 4.7% were vacant. The homeowner vacancy rate was 2.1% and the rental vacancy rate was 5.1%.

Racial composition as of the 2020 census
Race	Number	Percent
White	6,784	44.0%
Black or African American	1,412	9.2%
American Indian and Alaska Native	150	1.0%
Asian	3,951	25.6%
Native Hawaiian and Other Pacific Islander	184	1.2%
Some other race	1,340	8.7%
Two or more races	1,592	10.3%

=== 2000 census ===
As of the census of 2000, there were 24,383 people, 9,978 households, and 5,896 families residing in the CDP. The population density was 3,307.0 people per square mile (1,277.4/km^{2}). There were 10,703 housing units at an average density of 1,451.6/sq mi (560.7/km^{2}). The racial makeup of the CDP was 62.24% White, 9.92% African American, 1.28% Native American, 7.37% Asian, 0.50% Pacific Islander, 7.26% from other races, and 4.44% from two or more races. Hispanic or Latino of any race were 17.47% of the population.

There were 9,978 households, out of which 33.3% had children under the age of 18 living with them, 40.1% were married couples living together, 13.2% had a female householder with no husband present, and 40.9% were non-families. 30.4% of all households were made up of individuals, and 6.9% had someone living alone who was 65 years of age or older. The average household size was 2.43 and the average family size was 3.06.

In the CDP, the age distribution of the population shows 26.5% under the age of 18, 12.1% from 18 to 24, 36.6% from 25 to 44, 17.2% from 45 to 64, and 7.6% who were 65 years of age or older. The median age was 31 years. For every 100 females, there were 102.2 males. For every 100 females age 18 and over, there were 100.4 males.

The median income for a household in the CDP was $40,831, and the median income for a family was $44,378. Males had a median income of $35,204 versus $27,095 for females. The per capita income for the CDP was $19,801. About 8.4% of families and 11.0% of the population were below the poverty line, including 13.6% of those under age 18 and 12.0% of those age 65 or over.

== Education ==
The majority of the area is served by the Mukilteo School District. A small portion is in the Edmonds School District.

== See also ==
- Western Air Defense Force (Air Defense Command)
