= Prairie Heights, Washington =

- CDP
- Location within Washington (state)
- Coordinates: 47°09′18″N 122°07′12″W
- Country: United States
- State: Washington
- County: Pierce

Area
  - Total: 3.7 sq mi (9.7 km^{2})
- Elevation: 666 ft (203 m)

Population (2010)
  - Total: 4,405
  - Density: 1,200/sq mi (450/km^{2})
- Time zone: Pacific
- Area code: 360
- GNIS feature ID: 2585022

Prairie Heights is a census-designated place (CDP) located in Pierce County, Washington. As of the 2020 census, Prairie Heights had a population of 4,561.

== Demographics ==
Historical population
Census	Pop.	Note	%±
2010	4,405		—
2020	4,561		3.5%
U.S. Decennial Census; 2000 2010

Prairie Heights first appeared as a census designated place in the 2010 U.S. census.

=== Racial and ethnic composition ===
Prairie Heights CDP, Washington – Racial and ethnic composition Note: the US Census treats Hispanic/Latino as an ethnic category. This table excludes Latinos from the racial categories and assigns them to a separate category. Hispanics/Latinos may be of any race.
Race / Ethnicity (NH = Non-Hispanic)	Pop 2010	Pop 2020	% 2010	% 2020
White alone (NH)	3,938	3,655	89.40%	80.14%
Black or African American alone (NH)	29	33	0.66%	0.72%
Native American or Alaska Native alone (NH)	59	32	1.34%	0.70%
Asian alone (NH)	37	51	0.84%	1.12%
Native Hawaiian or Pacific Islander alone (NH)	5	5	0.11%	0.11%
Other race alone (NH)	1	38	0.02%	0.83%
Mixed race or Multiracial (NH)	136	354	3.09%	7.76%
Hispanic or Latino (any race)	200	393	4.54%	8.62%
Total	4,405	4,561	100.00%	100.00%

=== 2010 census ===
In 2010, it had a population of 4,405 inhabitants. 2,286 are male. 2,119 are female.
