= Canterwood, Washington =

- CDP
- Location within Washington (state)
- Coordinates: 47°22′21″N 122°36′06″W
- Country: United States
- State: Washington
- County: Pierce

Area
  - Total: 2.2 sq mi (5.6 km^{2})
- Elevation: 351 ft (107 m)

Population (2020)
  - Total: 3,572
  - Density: 1,700/sq mi (640/km^{2})
- Time zone: Pacific
- ZIP code: 98332
- Area code: 253
- GNIS feature ID: 2584955

Canterwood is a census-designated place (CDP) located in Pierce County, Washington. As of the 2020 census, Canterwood had a population of 3,572.

== Demographics ==
Historical population
Census	Pop.	Note	%±
2010	3,079		—
2020	3,572		16.0%
U.S. Decennial Census; 2000 2010

Canterwood first appeared as a census designated place in the 2010 U.S. census.

=== Racial and ethnic composition ===
Canterwood CDP, Washington – Racial and ethnic composition Note: the US Census treats Hispanic/Latino as an ethnic category. This table excludes Latinos from the racial categories and assigns them to a separate category. Hispanics/Latinos may be of any race.
Race / Ethnicity (NH = Non-Hispanic)	Pop 2010	Pop 2020	% 2010	% 2020
White alone (NH)	2,641	2,810	85.77%	78.67%
Black or African American alone (NH)	28	38	0.91%	1.06%
Native American or Alaska Native alone (NH)	30	19	0.97%	0.53%
Asian alone (NH)	164	211	5.33%	5.91%
Native Hawaiian or Pacific Islander alone (NH)	5	22	0.16%	0.62%
Other race alone (NH)	5	10	0.16%	0.28%
Mixed race or Multiracial (NH)	103	243	3.35%	6.80%
Hispanic or Latino (any race)	103	219	3.35%	6.13%
Total	3,079	3,572	100.00%	100.00%

=== 2010 census ===
In 2010, it had a population of 3,079 inhabitants. Of those, 1,473 are male and 1,606 are female.
