= Northwest Snohomish, Washington =

- former CDP
- Location of Northwest Snohomish, Washington
- Coordinates: 47°56′13″N 122°6′13″W
- Country: United States
- State: Washington
- County: Snohomish

Area
  - Total: 2.6 sq mi (6.8 km^{2})
  - Land: 2.5 sq mi (6.6 km^{2})
  - Water: 0.077 sq mi (0.2 km^{2})

Population (2000)
  - Total: 2,061
  - Density: 813/sq mi (313.9/km^{2})
- Time zone: UTC-8 (Pacific (PST))
  - Summer (DST): UTC-7 (PDT)
- FIPS code: 53-50191

Northwest Snohomish is a former census-designated place (CDP) in Snohomish County, Washington, United States. The population was 2,061 at the 2000 census. The CDP ceased to exist at the 2010 census, with some parts having been annexed by Snohomish and other parts going to the new Fobes Hill CDP.

== Geography ==
Northwest Snohomish is located at 47°56′13″N 122°6′13″W (47.936926, -122.103607).

According to the United States Census Bureau, the CDP has a total area of 2.6 square miles (6.8 km^{2}), of which, 2.5 square miles (6.6 km^{2}) of it is land and 0.1 square miles (0.2 km^{2}) of it (3.42%) is water.

== Demographics ==
Historical population
Census	Pop.	Note	%±
2000	2,061		—
U.S. Decennial Census; 1970 1980 1990; 2000 2010

Northwest Snohomish first appeared as a census designated place in the 2000 U.S. census. It was deleted prior to the 2010 U.S. census.

As of the census of 2000, there were 2,061 people, 739 households, and 575 families residing in the CDP. The population density was 813.0 people per square mile (313.3/km^{2}). There were 760 housing units at an average density of 299.8/sq mi (115.5/km^{2}). The racial makeup of the CDP was 95.73% White, 0.29% African American, 0.63% Native American, 1.46% Asian, 0.05% Pacific Islander, 0.44% from other races, and 1.41% from two or more races. Hispanic or Latino of any race were 2.57% of the population.

There were 739 households, out of which 35.9% had children under the age of 18 living with them, 62.9% were married couples living together, 10.8% had a female householder with no husband present, and 22.1% were non-families. 16.8% of all households were made up of individuals, and 7.8% had someone living alone who was 65 years of age or older. The average household size was 2.79 and the average family size was 3.13.

In the CDP, the age distribution of the population shows 27.6% under the age of 18, 7.2% from 18 to 24, 29.0% from 25 to 44, 25.0% from 45 to 64, and 11.2% who were 65 years of age or older. The median age was 38 years. For every 100 females, there were 96.3 males. For every 100 females age 18 and over, there were 98.0 males.

The median income for a household in the CDP was $67,167, and the median income for a family was $70,250. Males had a median income of $43,661 versus $37,422 for females. The per capita income for the CDP was $23,327. About 3.3% of families and 3.2% of the population were below the poverty line, including 1.7% of those under age 18 and 3.8% of those age 65 or over.
