= Stimson Crossing, Washington =

- former CDP
- Location of Stimson Crossing, Washington
- Coordinates: 48°6′28″N 122°12′29″W
- Country: United States
- State: Washington
- County: Snohomish

Area
  - Total: 3.9 sq mi (10.2 km^{2})
  - Land: 3.9 sq mi (10.2 km^{2})
  - Water: 0 sq mi (0.0 km^{2})
- Elevation: 95 ft (29 m)

Population (2000)
  - Total: 773
  - Density: 200/sq mi (76/km^{2})
- Time zone: UTC-8 (Pacific (PST))
  - Summer (DST): UTC-7 (PDT)
- FIPS code: 53-68025
- GNIS feature ID: 1508747

Stimson Crossing is a former census-designated place (CDP) in Snohomish County, Washington, United States. The population was 773 at the 2000 census. The CDP was discontinued at the 2010 census.

== Geography ==
Stimson Crossing is located at 48°6′28″N 122°12′29″W (48.107737, -122.208044).

According to the United States Census Bureau, the CDP has a total area of 3.9 square miles (10.2 km^{2}), all of it land.

== Demographics ==
As of the census of 2000, there were 773 people, 289 households, and 217 families residing in the CDP. The population density was 196.9 people per square mile (75.9/km^{2}). There were 302 housing units at an average density of 76.9/sq mi (29.7/km^{2}). The racial makeup of the CDP was 92.24% White, 0.65% African American, 1.68% Native American, 2.46% Asian, 0.13% Pacific Islander, 0.13% from other races, and 2.72% from two or more races. Hispanic or Latino of any race were 2.07% of the population.

There were 289 households, out of which 31.5% had children under the age of 18 living with them, 67.1% were married couples living together, 5.2% had a female householder with no husband present, and 24.6% were non-families. 19.0% of all households were made up of individuals, and 4.5% had someone living alone who was 65 years of age or older. The average household size was 2.67 and the average family size was 3.09.

In the CDP, the age distribution of the population shows 23.2% under the age of 18, 6.7% from 18 to 24, 29.2% from 25 to 44, 28.2% from 45 to 64, and 12.7% who were 65 years of age or older. The median age was 41 years. For every 100 females, there were 106.7 males. For every 100 females age 18 and over, there were 103.4 males.

The median income for a household in the CDP was $61,042, and the median income for a family was $72,875. Males had a median income of $46,719 versus $33,750 for females. The per capita income for the CDP was $22,537. About 5.6% of families and 6.9% of the population were below the poverty line, including 5.3% of those under the age of 18 and 14.0% of those aged 65 or over.
