= Northwest Stanwood, Washington =

- CDP
- Location of Northwest Stanwood, Washington
- Coordinates: 48°15′22″N 122°21′1″W
- Country: United States
- State: Washington
- County: Snohomish

Area
  - Total: 2.2 sq mi (5.8 km^{2})
  - Land: 2.2 sq mi (5.8 km^{2})
  - Water: 0 sq mi (0.0 km^{2})
- Elevation: 135 ft (41 m)

Population (2020)
  - Total: 137
  - Density: 61/sq mi (24/km^{2})
- Time zone: UTC-8 (Pacific (PST))
  - Summer (DST): UTC-7 (PDT)
- ZIP Code: 98292
- Area code(s): 360, 564
- FIPS code: 53-50175
- GNIS feature ID: 1852954

Northwest Stanwood is a census-designated place (CDP) in Snohomish County, Washington, United States. The population was 137 at the 2020 census. The CDP was known as North Stanwood prior to the 2010 census, and it included area that is now part of the city of Stanwood.

== Geography ==
Northwest Stanwood is located at 48°15′22″N 122°21′1″W (48.256234, -122.350369).

According to the United States Census Bureau, the CDP has a total area of 2.2 square miles (5.8 km^{2}), all of it land.

== Demographics ==
Historical population
Census	Pop.	Note	%±
2000	468		—
2010	149		−68.2%
2020	137		−8.1%
U.S. Decennial Census; 1960 1970 1980 1990; 2000 2010; Listed as North Stanwood in 2000

A census designated place named North Stanwood was listed in the 2000 U.S. census. After the city of Stanwood annexed part of North Stanwood, the remaining area was designated as a new CDP under the name Northwest Stanwood.

=== Racial and ethnic composition ===
Northwest Stanwood CDP, Washington – Racial and ethnic composition Note: the US Census treats Hispanic/Latino as an ethnic category. This table excludes Latinos from the racial categories and assigns them to a separate category. Hispanics/Latinos may be of any race.
Race / Ethnicity (NH = Non-Hispanic)	Pop 2000	Pop 2010	Pop 2020	% 2000	% 2010	% 2020
White alone (NH)	436	123	111	93.16%	82.55%	81.02%
Black or African American alone (NH)	0	1	0	0.00%	0.67%	0.00%
Native American or Alaska Native alone (NH)	3	1	1	0.64%	0.67%	0.73%
Asian alone (NH)	6	5	2	1.28%	3.36%	1.46%
Native Hawaiian or Pacific Islander alone (NH)	1	0	2	0.21%	0.00%	1.46%
Other race alone (NH)	0	0	0	0.00%	0.00%	0.00%
Mixed race or Multiracial (NH)	10	4	9	2.14%	2.68%	6.57%
Hispanic or Latino (any race)	12	15	12	2.56%	10.07%	8.76%
Total	468	149	137	100.00%	100.00%	100.00%

=== 2000 census ===
As of the census of 2000, there were 468 people, 172 households, and 125 families residing in the CDP. The population density was 207.8 people per square mile (80.3/km^{2}). There were 179 housing units at an average density of 79.5/sq mi (30.7/km^{2}). The racial makeup of the CDP was 95.73% White, 0.64% Native American, 1.28% Asian, 0.21% Pacific Islander, and 2.14% from two or more races. Hispanic or Latino of any race were 2.56% of the population.

There were 172 households, out of which 36.6% had children under the age of 18 living with them, 64.0% were married couples living together, 6.4% had a female householder with no husband present, and 27.3% were non-families. 23.3% of all households were made up of individuals, and 9.9% had someone living alone who was 65 years of age or older. The average household size was 2.72 and the average family size was 3.24.

In the CDP, the age distribution of the population shows 28.8% under the age of 18, 5.3% from 18 to 24, 27.4% from 25 to 44, 25.2% from 45 to 64, and 13.2% who were 65 years of age or older. The median age was 40 years. For every 100 females, there were 101.7 males. For every 100 females age 18 and over, there were 103.0 males.

The median income for a household in the CDP was $58,194, and the median income for a family was $65,139. Males had a median income of $40,179 versus $35,469 for females. The per capita income for the CDP was $24,128. None of the families and 1.6% of the population were living below the poverty line, including no under eighteens and none of those over 64.

== Education ==
The community is served by the Stanwood-Camano School District.

The zoned elementary school and middle school are Utsalady Elementary School (in Camano) and Port Susan Middle School. The Stanwood-Camano district's sole comprehensive high school is Stanwood High School.
