= Weallup Lake, Washington =

- former CDP
- Location of Weallup Lake, Washington
- Coordinates: 48°6′55″N 122°18′53″W
- Country: United States
- State: Washington
- County: Snohomish

Area
  - Total: 4.4 sq mi (11.3 km^{2})
  - Land: 4.3 sq mi (11.2 km^{2})
  - Water: 0.039 sq mi (0.1 km^{2})
- Elevation: 269 ft (82 m)

Population (2000)
  - Total: 882
  - Density: 204/sq mi (78.9/km^{2})
- Time zone: UTC-8 (Pacific (PST))
  - Summer (DST): UTC-7 (PDT)
- FIPS code: 53-76800
- GNIS feature ID: 1867641

Weallup Lake is a former census-designated place (CDP) in Snohomish County, Washington, United States. The population was 882 at the 2000 census. The CDP was discontinued at the 2010 census.

== Geography ==
Weallup Lake is located at 48°6′55″N 122°18′53″W (48.115323, -122.314596).

According to the United States Census Bureau, the CDP has a total area of 4.3 square miles (11.3 km^{2}), of which, 4.3 square miles (11.2 km^{2}) of it is land and 0.04 square miles (0.1 km^{2}) of it (0.69%) is water.

== Demographics ==
As of the census of 2000, there were 882 people, 452 households, and 273 families residing in the CDP. The population density was 204.3 people per square mile (78.8/km^{2}). There were 503 housing units at an average density of 116.5/sq mi (45.0/km^{2}). The racial makeup of the CDP was 94.90% White, 0.11% African American, 1.25% Native American, 0.45% Asian, 0.57% Pacific Islander, 1.02% from other races, and 1.70% from two or more races. Hispanic or Latino of any race were 3.85% of the population.

There were 452 households, out of which 12.4% had children under the age of 18 living with them, 54.2% were married couples living together, 4.0% had a female householder with no husband present, and 39.6% were non-families. 33.6% of all households were made up of individuals, and 14.4% had someone living alone who was 65 years of age or older. The average household size was 1.95 and the average family size was 2.44.

In the CDP, the age distribution of the population shows 13.4% under the age of 18, 3.9% from 18 to 24, 18.5% from 25 to 44, 36.5% from 45 to 64, and 27.8% who were 65 years of age or older. The median age was 55 years. For every 100 females, there were 110.5 males. For every 100 females age 18 and over, there were 104.8 males.

The median income for a household in the CDP was $35,143, and the median income for a family was $45,375. Males had a median income of $37,426 versus $36,667 for females. The per capita income for the CDP was $22,390. About 1.2% of families and 3.8% of the population were below the poverty line, including none of those under age 18 and 4.2% of those age 65 or over.
