= North Marysville, Washington =

- CDP
- Location of North Marysville, Washington
- Coordinates: 48°5′48″N 122°9′18″W
- Country: United States
- State: Washington
- County: Snohomish

Area
  - Total: 1.3 sq mi (3.4 km^{2})
  - Land: 1.3 sq mi (3.4 km^{2})
  - Water: 0 sq mi (0.0 km^{2})
- Elevation: 82 ft (25 m)

Population (2010)
  - Total: 108
  - Density: 83/sq mi (32.2/km^{2})
- Time zone: UTC-8 (Pacific (PST))
  - Summer (DST): UTC-7 (PDT)
- FIPS code: 53-49992
- GNIS feature ID: 1867623

North Marysville is a former census-designated place (CDP) in Snohomish County, Washington, United States. The majority of the community and its 20,000 residents were annexed into the city of Marysville in 2009. The population was 108 at the 2010 census. It was absorbed into the Sisco Heights and Lake Cassidy CDPs in the 2020 census.

== Geography ==
North Marysville is located at 48°5′48″N 122°9′18″W (48.096777, -122.155135).

According to the United States Census Bureau, the CDP has a total area of 1.3 square miles (3.4 km^{2}), all of it land.

== Demographics ==
Historical population
Census	Pop.	Note	%±
1980	15,159		—
1990	18,711		23.4%
2000	21,161		13.1%
2010	108		−99.5%
U.S. Decennial Census; 1970 1980 1990; 2000 2010

As of the census of 2000, there were 21,161 people, 7,031 households, and 5,744 families residing in the CDP. The population density was 1,539.6 people per square mile (594.6/km^{2}). There were 7,186 housing units at an average density of 522.8/sq mi (201.9/km^{2}). The racial makeup of the CDP was 89.84% White, 0.71% African American, 1.27% Native American, 3.35% Asian, 0.17% Pacific Islander, 1.75% from other races, and 2.92% from two or more races. Hispanic or Latino of any race were 4.60% of the population.

There were 7,031 households, out of which 44.6% had children under the age of 18 living with them, 67.2% were married couples living together, 9.7% had a female householder with no husband present, and 18.3% were non-families. 13.3% of all households were made up of individuals, and 4.0% had someone living alone who was 65 years of age or older. The average household size was 3.01 and the average family size was 3.27.

In the CDP, the age distribution of the population shows 30.9% under the age of 18, 7.4% from 18 to 24, 32.8% from 25 to 44, 21.2% from 45 to 64, and 7.7% who were 65 years of age or older. The median age was 34 years. For every 100 females, there were 100.1 males. For every 100 females age 18 and over, there were 97.7 males.

The median income for a household in the CDP was $56,699, and the median income for a family was $59,694. Males had a median income of $45,420 versus $29,935 for females. The per capita income for the CDP was $20,842. About 3.6% of families and 4.9% of the population were below the poverty line, including 5.6% of those under age 18 and 3.0% of those age 65 or over.
