= North Sultan, Washington =

- CDP
- Location of North Sultan, Washington
- Coordinates: 47°53′7″N 121°48′46″W
- Country: United States
- State: Washington
- County: Snohomish

Area
  - Total: 1.2 sq mi (3.2 km^{2})
  - Land: 1.2 sq mi (3.1 km^{2})
  - Water: 0 sq mi (0.0 km^{2})
- Elevation: 335 ft (102 m)

Population (2020)
  - Total: 256
  - Density: 210/sq mi (83/km^{2})
- Time zone: UTC-8 (Pacific (PST))
  - Summer (DST): UTC-7 (PDT)
- FIPS code: 53-50183
- GNIS feature ID: 1852955

North Sultan is a census-designated place (CDP) in Snohomish County, Washington, United States. The population was 256 at the 2020 census.

== Geography ==
North Sultan is located at 47°53′7″N 121°48′46″W (47.885318, -121.812739).

According to the United States Census Bureau, the CDP has a total area of 1.2 square miles (3.2 km^{2}), of which, 1.2 square miles (3.1 km^{2}) of it is land and 0.82% is water.

North Sultan is located north of Sultan, which lies on U.S. Route 2.

== Demographics ==
Historical population
Census	Pop.	Note	%±
2000	381		—
2010	264		−30.7%
2020	256		−3.0%
U.S. Decennial Census; 1970 1980 1990; 2000 2010

North Sultan first appeared as a census designated place in the 2000 U.S. census.

=== Racial and ethnic composition ===
North Sultan CDP, Washington – Racial and ethnic composition Note: the US Census treats Hispanic/Latino as an ethnic category. This table excludes Latinos from the racial categories and assigns them to a separate category. Hispanics/Latinos may be of any race.
Race / Ethnicity (NH = Non-Hispanic)	Pop 2000	Pop 2010	Pop 2020	% 2000	% 2010	% 2020
White alone (NH)	368	245	211	96.59%	92.80%	82.42%
Black or African American alone (NH)	0	1	4	0.00%	0.38%	1.56%
Native American or Alaska Native alone (NH)	7	0	0	1.84%	0.00%	0.00%
Asian alone (NH)	1	3	5	0.26%	1.14%	1.95%
Native Hawaiian or Pacific Islander alone (NH)	0	0	0	0.00%	0.00%	0.00%
Other race alone (NH)	2	0	1	0.52%	0.00%	0.39%
Mixed race or Multiracial (NH)	2	2	24	0.52%	0.76%	9.38%
Hispanic or Latino (any race)	1	13	11	0.26%	4.92%	4.30%
Total	381	264	256	100.00%	100.00%	100.00%

=== 2000 census ===
As of the census of 2000, there were 381 people, 124 households, and 102 families living in the CDP. The population density was 316.2 people per square mile (122.6/km^{2}). There were 130 housing units at an average density of 107.9/sq mi (41.8/km^{2}). The racial makeup of the CDP was 96.85% White, 1.84% Native American, 0.26% Asian, 0.52% from other races, and 0.52% from two or more races. Hispanic or Latino of any race were 0.26% of the population.

There were 124 households, out of which 46.0% had children under the age of 18 living with them, 75.8% were married couples living together, 4.0% had a female householder with no husband present, and 17.7% were non-families. 13.7% of all households were made up of individuals, and 4.8% had someone living alone who was 65 years of age or older. The average household size was 3.07 and the average family size was 3.37.

In the CDP, the age distribution of the population shows 33.1% under the age of 18, 3.9% from 18 to 24, 32.3% from 25 to 44, 22.8% from 45 to 64, and 7.9% who were 65 years of age or older. The median age was 35 years. For every 100 females, there were 112.8 males. For every 100 females age 18 and over, there were 114.3 males.

The median income for a household in the CDP was $65,179, and the median income for a family was $65,179. Males had a median income of $51,083 versus $31,339 for females. The per capita income for the CDP was $19,989. None of the population or families were below the poverty line.
