= Hazel Dell North, Washington =

- Former CDP
- Location of Hazel Dell North, Washington
- Coordinates: 45°41′14″N 122°39′29″W
- Country: United States
- State: Washington
- County: Clark

Area
  - Total: 2.7 sq mi (6.9 km^{2})
  - Land: 2.7 sq mi (6.9 km^{2})
  - Water: 0 sq mi (0.0 km^{2})

Population (2000)
  - Total: 9,261
  - Density: 3,469/sq mi (1,339.5/km^{2})
- Time zone: UTC-8 (Pacific (PST))
  - Summer (DST): UTC-7 (PDT)
- FIPS code: 53-30312

Hazel Dell North was the name of a census-designated place in Clark County, Washington, United States. The population was 9,261 at the 2000 census. For the 2010 census the U.S. Census Bureau combined Hazel Dell North and South to form a single CDP named "Hazel Dell".

== Geography ==
According to the United States Census Bureau, the CDP had a total area of 2.7 square miles (6.9 km^{2}), of which 0.37% was water.

=== Climate ===
This region typically experiences warm and dry summers, with the average monthly temperatures at 71.6 °F. According to the Köppen Climate Classification system, Hazel Dell North has a warm-summer Mediterranean climate, abbreviated "Csb" on climate maps.

Climate data for Hazel Dell North, Washington
Month	Jan	Feb	Mar	Apr	May	Jun	Jul	Aug	Sep	Oct	Nov	Dec	Year
Mean daily maximum °F (°C)	42 (6)	48 (9)	53 (12)	60 (16)	66 (19)	71 (22)	78 (26)	78 (26)	73 (23)	62 (17)	51 (11)	44 (7)	60 (16)
Daily mean °F (°C)	37 (3)	41 (5)	44 (7)	50 (10)	55 (13)	60 (16)	66 (19)	66 (19)	60 (16)	51 (11)	44 (7)	39 (4)	50.0 (10.0)
Mean daily minimum °F (°C)	32 (0)	33 (1)	35 (2)	39 (4)	44 (7)	50 (10)	53 (12)	51 (11)	48 (9)	42 (6)	37 (3)	33 (1)	41 (5)
Average precipitation inches (mm)	5.8 (150)	4.3 (110)	3.8 (97)	2.6 (66)	2.2 (56)	1.7 (43)	0.8 (20)	0.9 (23)	1.8 (46)	3.1 (79)	5.8 (150)	6.4 (160)	39.1 (990)
Average snowfall inches (cm)	0.5 (1.3)	0.6 (1.5)	0.2 (0.51)	0.0 (0.0)	0.0 (0.0)	0.0 (0.0)	0.0 (0.0)	0.0 (0.0)	0.0 (0.0)	0.0 (0.0)	0.0 (0.0)	0.2 (0.51)	1.5 (3.8)
Average precipitation days (≥ 0.01 in.)	20.3	16	19.2	17.4	14.8	9.7	4.2	3.9	7.7	14.2	20.5	20.3	168.2
Average snowy days (≥ 0.1 in.)	0.5	0.5	0.2	0.0	0.0	0.0	0.0	0.0	0.0	0.0	0.0	0.5	1.7
Source: weatherbase.com

== Demographics ==
Historical population
Census	Pop.	Note	%±
1990	6,924		—
2000	9,261		33.8%

=== Racial and ethnic composition ===
Hazel Dell North CDP, Washington – Racial and ethnic composition Note: the US Census treats Hispanic/Latino as an ethnic category. This table excludes Latinos from the racial categories and assigns them to a separate category. Hispanics/Latinos may be of any race.
Race / Ethnicity (NH = Non-Hispanic)	Pop 2000	2000
White alone (NH)	7,442	80.36%
Black or African American alone (NH)	230	2.48%
Native American or Alaska Native alone (NH)	65	0.70%
Asian alone (NH)	206	2.22%
Native Hawaiian or Pacific Islander alone (NH)	38	0.41%
Other race alone (NH)	7	0.08%
Mixed race or Multiracial (NH)	236	2.55%
Hispanic or Latino (any race)	1,037	11.20%
Total	9,261	100.00%

As of the census of 2000, there were 9,261 people, 3,535 households, and 2,403 families residing in the CDP. The population density was 3,469.3 people per square mile (1,339.2/km^{2}). There were 3,744 housing units at an average density of 1,402.5/sq mi (541.4/km^{2}). The racial makeup of the CDP was 84.29% White, 2.58% African American, 0.87% Native American, 2.24% Asian, 0.41% Pacific Islander, 6.04% from other races, and 3.57% from two or more races. Hispanic or Latino of any race were 11.20% of the population. 14.6% were of German, 10.4% English, 8.1% Irish and 6.6% American ancestry according to Census 2000.

There were 3,535 households, out of which 34.9% had children under the age of 18 living with them, 51.7% were married couples living together, 11.9% had a female householder with no husband present, and 32.0% were non-families. 24.8% of all households were made up of individuals, and 8.1% had someone living alone who was 65 years of age or older. The average household size was 2.62 and the average family size was 3.11.

In the CDP, the age distribution of the population shows 27.7% under the age of 18, 9.9% from 18 to 24, 30.5% from 25 to 44, 21.1% from 45 to 64, and 10.7% who were 65 years of age or older. The median age was 34 years. For every 100 females, there were 99.0 males. For every 100 females age 18 and over, there were 95.4 males.

The median income for a household in the CDP was $43,063, and the median income for a family was $48,610. Males had a median income of $40,087 versus $29,968 for females. The per capita income for the CDP was $19,518. About 11.8% of families and 14.5% of the population were below the poverty line, including 23.4% of those under age 18 and 3.8% of those age 65 or over.
