= Stansberry Lake, Washington =

- CDP
- Location within Washington (state)
- Coordinates: 47°22′38″N 122°42′40″W
- Country: United States
- State: Washington
- County: Pierce

Area
  - Total: 2.1 sq mi (5.4 km^{2})
- Elevation: 259 ft (79 m)

Population (2010)
  - Total: 2,101
  - Density: 1,000/sq mi (390/km^{2})
- Time zone: Pacific
- ZIP code: 98329
- Area code: 253
- GNIS feature ID: 2585042

Stansberry Lake is a census-designated place located in Pierce County, Washington. As of the 2020 census, Stansberry Lake had a population of 2,087.

== Demographics ==
Historical population
Census	Pop.	Note	%±
2010	2,101		—
2020	2,087		−0.7%
U.S. Decennial Census; 2000 2010

Stansberry Lake first appeared as a census designated place in the 2010 U.S. census.

=== Racial and ethnic composition ===
Stansberry Lake CDP, Washington – Racial and ethnic composition Note: the US Census treats Hispanic/Latino as an ethnic category. This table excludes Latinos from the racial categories and assigns them to a separate category. Hispanics/Latinos may be of any race.
Race / Ethnicity (NH = Non-Hispanic)	Pop 2010	Pop 2020	% 2010	% 2020
White alone (NH)	1,799	1,629	85.63%	78.05%
Black or African American alone (NH)	12	20	0.57%	0.96%
Native American or Alaska Native alone (NH)	20	15	0.95%	0.72%
Asian alone (NH)	32	37	1.52%	1.77%
Native Hawaiian or Pacific Islander alone (NH)	3	12	0.14%	0.57%
Other race alone (NH)	3	4	0.14%	0.19%
Mixed race or Multiracial (NH)	112	197	5.33%	9.44%
Hispanic or Latino (any race)	120	173	5.71%	8.29%
Total	2,101	2,087	100.00%	100.00%

=== 2010 census ===
In 2010, it had a population of 2,101 inhabitants. 1,061 are male. 1,040 are female.
