= John Sam Lake, Washington =

- former CDP
- Location of John Sam Lake, Washington
- Coordinates: 48°6′34″N 122°14′46″W
- Country: United States
- State: Washington
- County: Snohomish

Area
  - Total: 5.0 sq mi (12.9 km^{2})
  - Land: 4.9 sq mi (12.7 km^{2})
  - Water: 0.077 sq mi (0.2 km^{2})
- Elevation: 545 ft (166 m)

Population (2000)
  - Total: 753
  - Density: 154/sq mi (59.3/km^{2})
- Time zone: UTC-8 (Pacific (PST))
  - Summer (DST): UTC-7 (PDT)
- FIPS code: 53-34220
- GNIS feature ID: 1867615

John Sam Lake is a former census-designated place (CDP) in Snohomish County, Washington, United States. The population was 753 at the 2000 census. The CDP was discontinued at the 2010 census.

== Geography ==
John Sam Lake is located at 48°6′34″N 122°14′46″W (48.109327, -122.245989).

According to the United States Census Bureau, the CDP has a total area of 5.0 square miles (12.9 km^{2}), of which, 4.9 square miles (12.7 km^{2}) of it is land and 0.1 square miles (0.2 km^{2}) of it (1.61%) is water.

== Demographics ==
As of the census of 2000, there were 753 people, 251 households, and 200 families residing in the CDP. The population density was 153.5 people per square mile (59.3/km^{2}). There were 256 housing units at an average density of 52.2/sq mi (20.2/km^{2}). The racial makeup of the CDP was 87.65% White, 7.70% Native American, 1.20% Asian, 0.13% Pacific Islander, 0.27% from other races, and 3.05% from two or more races. Hispanic or Latino of any race were 1.99% of the population.

There were 251 households, out of which 43.0% had children under the age of 18 living with them, 69.7% were married couples living together, 6.0% had a female householder with no husband present, and 20.3% were non-families. 12.4% of all households were made up of individuals, and 2.4% had someone living alone who was 65 years of age or older. The average household size was 3.00 and the average family size was 3.34.

In the CDP, the age distribution of the population shows 28.4% under the age of 18, 8.1% from 18 to 24, 32.7% from 25 to 44, 24.7% from 45 to 64, and 6.1% who were 65 years of age or older. The median age was 37 years. For every 100 females, there were 96.1 males. For every 100 females age 18 and over, there were 106.5 males.

The median income for a household in the CDP was $52,656, and the median income for a family was $53,281. Males had a median income of $42,188 versus $31,442 for females. The per capita income for the CDP was $19,907. About 3.1% of families and 3.0% of the population were below the poverty line, including 1.5% of those under age 18 and 7.1% of those age 65 or over.
