= Shaker Church, Washington =

- former CDP
- Location of Shaker Church, Washington
- Coordinates: 48°3′10″N 122°14′47″W
- Country: United States
- State: Washington
- County: Snohomish

Area
  - Total: 4.7 sq mi (12.2 km^{2})
  - Land: 4.7 sq mi (12.2 km^{2})
  - Water: 0 sq mi (0.0 km^{2})
- Elevation: 272 ft (83 m)

Population (2000)
  - Total: 787
  - Density: 167/sq mi (64.3/km^{2})
- Time zone: UTC-8 (Pacific (PST))
  - Summer (DST): UTC-7 (PDT)
- FIPS code: 53-63550
- GNIS feature ID: 1867630

Shaker Church is a former census-designated place (CDP) in Snohomish County, Washington, United States. The population was 787 at the 2000 census. The CDP was discontinued at the 2010 census.

== Geography ==
Shaker Church is located at 48°3′10″N 122°14′47″W (48.052713, -122.246453).

According to the United States Census Bureau, the CDP has a total area of 4.7 square miles (12.3 km^{2}), all of it land.

== Demographics ==
As of the census of 2000, there were 787 people, 260 households, and 215 families residing in the CDP. The population density was 166.5 people per square mile (64.2/km^{2}). There were 266 housing units at an average density of 56.3/sq mi (21.7/km^{2}). The racial makeup of the CDP was 59.34% White, 0.51% African American, 35.20% Native American, 0.51% Asian, 0.89% from other races, and 3.56% from two or more races. Hispanic or Latino of any race were 7.88% of the population.

There were 260 households, out of which 40.0% had children under the age of 18 living with them, 55.4% were married couples living together, 15.8% had a female householder with no husband present, and 17.3% were non-families. 14.2% of all households were made up of individuals, and 1.5% had someone living alone who was 65 years of age or older. The average household size was 3.03 and the average family size was 3.21.

In the CDP, the age distribution of the population shows 30.9% under the age of 18, 8.4% from 18 to 24, 31.4% from 25 to 44, 22.7% from 45 to 64, and 6.6% who were 65 years of age or older. The median age was 34 years. For every 100 females, there were 99.2 males. For every 100 females age 18 and over, there were 107.6 males.

The median income for a household in the CDP was $54,750, and the median income for a family was $57,946. Males had a median income of $41,000 versus $33,125 for females. The per capita income for the CDP was $19,420. About 8.9% of families and 14.8% of the population were below the poverty line, including 22.0% of those under age 18 and none of those age 65 or over.

== See also ==
- Indian Shaker Church
