= Cathan, Washington =

- former CDP
- Location of Cathan, Washington
- Coordinates: 48°6′50″N 122°16′29″W
- Country: United States
- State: Washington
- County: Snohomish

Area
  - Total: 2.7 sq mi (7.0 km^{2})
  - Land: 2.7 sq mi (6.9 km^{2})
  - Water: 0.039 sq mi (0.1 km^{2})
- Elevation: 367 ft (112 m)

Population (2000)
  - Total: 526
  - Density: 198/sq mi (76.5/km^{2})
- Time zone: UTC-8 (Pacific (PST))
  - Summer (DST): UTC-7 (PDT)
- FIPS code: 53-10585
- GNIS feature ID: 1867604

Cathan is a former census-designated place (CDP) in Snohomish County, Washington, United States. The population was 526 at the 2000 census. The CDP was discontinued at the 2010 census.

== Geography ==
Cathan is located at 48°6′50″N 122°16′29″W (48.113880, -122.274621).

According to the United States Census Bureau, the CDP has a total area of 2.7 square miles (6.9 km^{2}), of which, 2.7 square miles (6.9 km^{2}) of it is land and 0.04 square miles (0.1 km^{2}) of it (1.12%) is water.

== Demographics ==
As of the census of 2000, there were 526 people, 176 households, and 136 families residing in the CDP. The population density was 198.1 people per square mile (76.6/km^{2}). There were 181 housing units at an average density of 68.2/sq mi (26.4/km^{2}). The racial makeup of the CDP was 90.11% White, 0.38% African American, 3.61% Native American, 1.52% Asian, 0.57% Pacific Islander, and 3.80% from two or more races. Hispanic or Latino of any race were 2.66% of the population.

There were 176 households, out of which 38.6% had children under the age of 18 living with them, 65.3% were married couples living together, 8.0% had a female householder with no husband present, and 22.7% were non-families. 14.8% of all households were made up of individuals, and 0.6% had someone living alone who was 65 years of age or older. The average household size was 2.99 and the average family size was 3.28.

In the CDP, the age distribution of the population shows 28.9% under the age of 18, 7.6% from 18 to 24, 30.4% from 25 to 44, 28.9% from 45 to 64, and 4.2% who were 65 years of age or older. The median age was 37 years. For every 100 females, there were 108.7 males. For every 100 females age 18 and over, there were 102.2 males.

The median income for a household in the CDP was $58,875, and the median income for a family was $61,250. Males had a median income of $44,375 versus $31,339 for females. The per capita income for the CDP was $20,940. About 1.5% of families and 1.8% of the population were below the poverty line, including 1.3% of those under age 18 and none of those age 65 or over.
