= Hazel Dell South, Washington =

- Former CDP
- Location of Hazel Dell South, Washington
- Coordinates: 45°40′14″N 122°40′12″W
- Country: United States
- State: Washington
- County: Clark

Area
  - Total: 2.2 sq mi (5.6 km^{2})
  - Land: 2.2 sq mi (5.6 km^{2})
  - Water: 0 sq mi (0.0 km^{2})

Population (2000)
  - Total: 6,605
  - Density: 3,053/sq mi (1,178.9/km^{2})
- Time zone: UTC-8 (Pacific (PST))
  - Summer (DST): UTC-7 (PDT)
- FIPS code: 53-30313

Hazel Dell South was the name of a census-designated place (CDP) in Clark County, Washington, United States. The population was 6,605 at the 2000 census. For the 2010 census the U.S. Census Bureau combined this area with Hazel Dell North to form a single CDP called "Hazel Dell".

== Geography ==
According to the United States Census Bureau, the CDP had a total area of 2.2 square miles (5.6 km^{2}), all of it land.

== Demographics ==
Historical population
Census	Pop.	Note	%±
1990	5,796		—
2000	6,605		14.0%

As of the census of 2000, there were 6,605 people, 2,742 households, and 1,636 families residing in the CDP. The population density was 3,053.4 people per square mile (1,180.7/km^{2}). There were 2,974 housing units at an average density of 1,374.8/sq mi (531.6/km^{2}). The racial makeup of the CDP was 88.16% White, 3.32% African American, 0.83% Native American, 1.88% Asian, 0.20% Pacific Islander, 2.18% from other races, and 3.44% from two or more races. Hispanic or Latino of any race were 5.03% of the population. 15.3% were of German, 9.3% English, 8.9% American, 7.3% Irish and 6.6% Norwegian ancestry according to Census 2000.

There were 2,742 households, out of which 28.0% had children under the age of 18 living with them, 43.8% were married couples living together, 11.4% had a female householder with no husband present, and 40.3% were non-families. 31.8% of all households were made up of individuals, and 13.3% had someone living alone who was 65 years of age or older. The average household size was 2.36 and the average family size was 2.97.

In the CDP, the age distribution of the population shows 24.5% under the age of 18, 9.1% from 18 to 24, 27.9% from 25 to 44, 22.2% from 45 to 64, and 16.3% who were 65 years of age or older. The median age was 37 years. For every 100 females, there were 94.7 males. For every 100 females age 18 and over, there were 91.2 males.

The median income for a household in the CDP was $36,571, and the median income for a family was $42,317. Males had a median income of $36,306 versus $26,288 for females. The per capita income for the CDP was $19,158. About 11.3% of families and 13.8% of the population were below the poverty line, including 19.0% of those under age 18 and 9.0% of those age 65 or over.
