= Larch Way, Washington =

- CDP
- Location within Washington (state)
- Coordinates: 47°50′34″N 122°15′10″W
- Country: United States
- State: Washington
- County: Snohomish

Area
  - Total: 2.9 km^{2} (1.1 sq mi)
- Elevation: 154 m (505 ft)

Population (2020)
  - Total: 4,993
  - Density: 1,700/km^{2} (4,500/sq mi)
- Time zone: Pacific
- Area code: 360

Larch Way is a census-designated place (CDP) located in Snohomish County, Washington. As of the 2020 census, Larch Way had a population of 4,993.

== Demographics ==
Historical population
Census	Pop.	Note	%±
2010	3,318		—
2020	4,993		50.5%
U.S. Decennial Census; 2000 2010

Larch Way first appeared as a census designated place in the 2010 U.S. census formed from part of the Martha Lake CDP and part of the deleted Picnic Point-North Lynnwood CDP.

=== Racial and ethnic composition ===
Larch Way CDP, Washington – Racial and ethnic composition Note: the US Census treats Hispanic/Latino as an ethnic category. This table excludes Latinos from the racial categories and assigns them to a separate category. Hispanics/Latinos may be of any race.
Race / Ethnicity (NH = Non-Hispanic)	Pop 2010	Pop 2020	% 2010	% 2020
White alone (NH)	1,820	2,034	54.85%	40.74%
Black or African American alone (NH)	88	336	2.65%	6.73%
Native American or Alaska Native alone (NH)	11	14	0.33%	0.28%
Asian alone (NH)	1,105	1,794	33.30%	35.93%
Native Hawaiian or Pacific Islander alone (NH)	22	55	0.66%	1.10%
Other race alone (NH)	5	39	0.15%	0.78%
Mixed race or Multiracial (NH)	131	345	3.95%	6.91%
Hispanic or Latino (any race)	136	376	4.10%	7.53%
Total	3,318	4,993	100.00%	100.00%

=== 2010 census ===
The population of Larch Way was 3,318 at the 2010 Census. 1,777 people are male. 1,541 are female.

== Geography ==
Larch Way is located at coordinates 47°50′34″N 122°15′10″W. The elevation is 505 feet.
