= Fobes Hill, Washington =

- CDP
- Location of Fobes Hill, Washington.
- Coordinates: 47°56′21″N 122°8′3″W
- Country: United States
- State: Washington
- County: Snohomish

Area
  - Total: 4.66 sq mi (12.06 km^{2})
  - Land: 4.66 sq mi (12.06 km^{2})
  - Water: 0 sq mi (0.00 km^{2})

Population (2010)
  - Total: 2,418
  - Density: 520/sq mi (200.6/km^{2})
- Time zone: UTC-8 (Pacific (PST))
  - Summer (DST): UTC-7 (PDT)
- GNIS feature ID: 1513114

Fobes Hill is an unincorporated community and a census-designated place (CDP) in Snohomish County, Washington, United States. As of the 2020 census, Fobes Hill had a population of 2,628. Fobes Hill is a middle class residential community located along Fobes Road, northwest of the city of Snohomish.

== Geography ==
Fobes Hill is located at 47°56′21″N 122°8′3″W (47.939220, -122.134076).

According to the United States Census Bureau, the CDP has a total area of 4.655 square miles (12.06 km^{2}), all of it land.

== Demographics ==
Historical population
Census	Pop.	Note	%±
2010	2,418		—
2020	2,628		8.7%
U.S. Decennial Census; 2000 2010

Fobes Hill first appeared as a census designated place in the 2010 U.S. census formed from part of the deleted Northwest Snohomish CDP and additional area.

=== Racial and ethnic composition ===
Fobes Hill CDP, Washington – Racial and ethnic composition Note: the US Census treats Hispanic/Latino as an ethnic category. This table excludes Latinos from the racial categories and assigns them to a separate category. Hispanics/Latinos may be of any race.
Race / Ethnicity (NH = Non-Hispanic)	Pop 2010	Pop 2020	% 2010	% 2020
White alone (NH)	2,275	2,302	94.09%	87.60%
Black or African American alone (NH)	5	9	0.21%	0.34%
Native American or Alaska Native alone (NH)	14	16	0.58%	0.61%
Asian alone (NH)	24	31	0.99%	1.18%
Native Hawaiian or Pacific Islander alone (NH)	4	3	0.17%	0.11%
Other race alone (NH)	8	21	0.33%	0.80%
Mixed race or Multiracial (NH)	33	159	1.36%	6.05%
Hispanic or Latino (any race)	55	87	2.27%	3.31%
Total	2,418	2,628	100.00%	100.00%
