= Sisco Heights, Washington =

- CDP
- Location within Washington (state)
- Coordinates: 48°07′08″N 122°6′27″W
- Country: United States
- State: Washington
- County: Snohomish

Area
  - Total: 12.53 sq mi (32.5 km^{2})
- Elevation: 449 ft (137 m)

Population (2020)
  - Total: 3,140
  - Density: 251/sq mi (96.8/km^{2})
  - Summer (DST): Pacific
- Area code: 360

Sisco Heights is a census-designated place (CDP) in Snohomish County, Washington, United States. It is located between Arlington and Marysville along State Route 9. As of the 2020 U.S. census, it had a population of 3,140 people.

== History ==
A post office called Sisco was established in 1902, and remained in operation until 1918. The community has the name of an early settler. Its school closed around 1925.

== Geography ==
The Sisco Heights CDP is 12.53 square miles (32.5 km^{2}).

== Demographics ==
Historical population
| Census | Pop. | Note | %± |
|---|---|---|---|
| 2010 | 2,696 | | — |
| 2020 | 3,140 | | 16.5% |
U.S. Decennial Census; 2000 2010

Sisco Heights first appeared as a census designated place in the 2010 U.S. census formed from part of North Marysville CDP and additional area.

=== Racial and ethnic composition ===
Sisco Heights CDP, Washington – Racial and ethnic composition Note: the US Census treats Hispanic/Latino as an ethnic category. This table excludes Latinos from the racial categories and assigns them to a separate category. Hispanics/Latinos may be of any race.
| Race / Ethnicity (NH = Non-Hispanic) | Pop 2010 | Pop 2020 | % 2010 | % 2020 |
|---|---|---|---|---|
| White alone (NH) | 2,451 | 2,579 | 90.91% | 82.13% |
| Black or African American alone (NH) | 11 | 20 | 0.41% | 0.64% |
| Native American or Alaska Native alone (NH) | 30 | 40 | 1.11% | 1.27% |
| Asian alone (NH) | 21 | 57 | 0.78% | 1.82% |
| Native Hawaiian or Pacific Islander alone (NH) | 3 | 4 | 0.11% | 0.13% |
| Other race alone (NH) | 4 | 9 | 0.15% | 0.29% |
| Mixed race or Multiracial (NH) | 55 | 183 | 2.04% | 5.83% |
| Hispanic or Latino (any race) | 121 | 248 | 4.49% | 7.90% |
| Total | 2,696 | 3,140 | 100.00% | 100.00% |

== Education ==
It is divided between the Arlington School District and the Marysville School District.
