= Rosedale, Washington =

- CDP
- Location within Washington (state)
- Coordinates: 47°20′38″N 122°37′39″W
- Country: United States
- State: Washington
- County: Pierce

Area
  - Total: 4.6 sq mi (12.0 km^{2})
- Elevation: 135 ft (41 m)

Population (2020)
  - Total: 4,357
  - Density: 940/sq mi (363/km^{2})
- Time zone: Pacific
- Area code: 253
- GNIS feature ID: 2585032

Rosedale is a census-designated place (CDP) located in Pierce County, Washington. As of the 2020 census, Rosedale had a population of 4,357.

A post office called Rosedale was established in 1887, and remained in operation until 1918. The community was named for roses near the original town site.

== Demographics ==
Historical population
Census	Pop.	Note	%±
2010	4,044		—
2020	4,357		7.7%
U.S. Decennial Census; 2000 2010

Rosedale first appeared as a census designated place in the 2010 U.S. census.

=== Racial and ethnic composition ===
Rosedale CDP, Washington – Racial and ethnic composition Note: the US Census treats Hispanic/Latino as an ethnic category. This table excludes Latinos from the racial categories and assigns them to a separate category. Hispanics/Latinos may be of any race.
Race / Ethnicity (NH = Non-Hispanic)	Pop 2010	Pop 2020	% 2010	% 2020
White alone (NH)	3,407	3,491	84.25%	80.12%
Black or African American alone (NH)	156	105	3.86%	2.41%
Native American or Alaska Native alone (NH)	70	78	1.73%	1.79%
Asian alone (NH)	71	80	1.76%	1.84%
Native Hawaiian or Pacific Islander alone (NH)	13	6	0.32%	0.14%
Other race alone (NH)	7	18	0.17%	0.41%
Mixed race or Multiracial (NH)	120	239	2.97%	5.49%
Hispanic or Latino (any race)	200	340	4.95%	7.80%
Total	4,044	4,357	100.00%	100.00%

In 2010, it had a population of 4,044 inhabitants. 1,478 are male. 2,566 are female.
