= Lake Cassidy, Washington =

- CDP
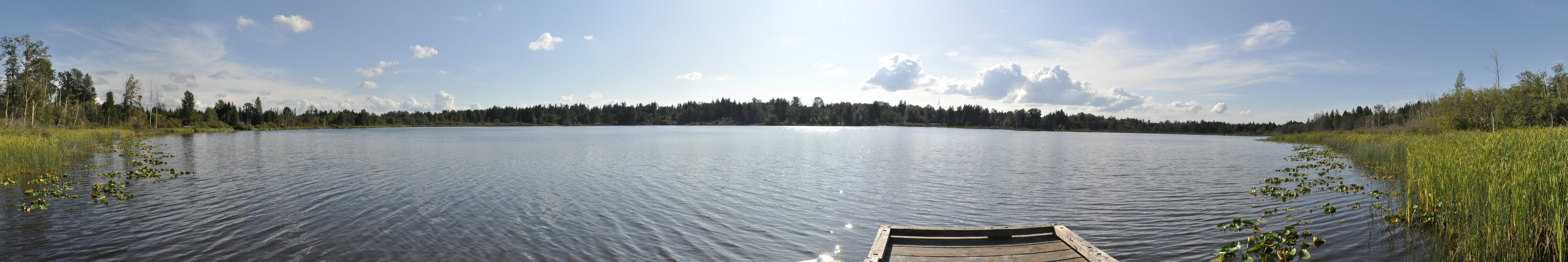
- Panorama view of Lake Cassidy

- Location within Washington (state)
- Coordinates: 48°03′58″N 122°04′57″W
- Country: United States
- State: Washington
- County: Snohomish

Area
  - Total: 10.8 sq mi (27.9 km^{2})
  - Land: 10.6 sq mi (27.4 km^{2})
  - Water: 0.23 sq mi (0.6 km^{2})
- Elevation: 371 ft (113 m)

Population (2020)
  - Total: 3,757
  - Density: 355/sq mi (137/km^{2})
- Time zone: Pacific
- Area code: 360

Lake Cassidy is a census-designated place (CDP) located in Snohomish County, Washington, United States. As of the 2020 census, Lake Cassidy had a population of 3,757.

== Geography ==
Lake Cassidy is located at coordinates 48°03′58″N 122°04′57″W (48.066044, -122.082433). The elevation is 371 feet.

According to the United States Census Bureau, the CDP has a total area of 10.8 square miles (27.9 km^{2}), of which, 10.6 square miles (27.4 km^{2}) of it is land and 0.2 square miles (0.6 km^{2}) of it (1.98%) is water.

== Demographics ==
Historical population
Census	Pop.	Note	%±
2010	3,415		—
2020	3,757		10.0%
U.S. Decennial Census; 2000 2010

Lake Cassidy first appeared as a census designated place in the 2010 U.S. census formed out of part of North Marysville CDP and additional area.

=== Racial and ethnic composition ===
Lake Cassidy, Washington – Racial and ethnic composition Note: the US Census treats Hispanic/Latino as an ethnic category. This table excludes Latinos from the racial categories and assigns them to a separate category. Hispanics/Latinos may be of any race.
Race / Ethnicity (NH = Non-Hispanic)	Pop 2010	Pop 2020	% 2010	% 2020
White alone (NH)	3,023	3,000	88.52%	79.85%
Black or African American alone (NH)	8	16	0.23%	0.43%
Native American or Alaska Native alone (NH)	38	33	1.11%	0.88%
Asian alone (NH)	75	73	2.20%	1.94%
Native Hawaiian or Pacific Islander alone (NH)	5	5	0.15%	0.13%
Other race alone (NH)	0	8	0.00%	0.21%
Mixed race or Multiracial (NH)	102	305	2.99%	8.12%
Hispanic or Latino (any race)	164	317	4.80%	8.44%
Total	3,415	3,757	100.00%	100.00%

=== 2010 census ===
The population of Lake Cassidy was 3,415 at the 2010 Census. 1,880 people are male. 1,535 are female.
