= Hillman (disambiguation) =

Hillman can mean:

== Cars ==
- The Hillman automobile marque, models of which include:
  - Hillman Wizard
  - Hillman 14
  - Hillman "Sixteen", "Hawk" and "80"
  - Hillman Minx
  - Hillman Imp
  - Hillman Hunter
  - Hillman Avenger

== Places ==
=== France ===
- Hillman Fortress, a German WW2 bunker complex in Normandy, France

=== United States ===
- Hillman, Georgia
- Hillman, Michigan
- Hillman Township, Michigan
- Hillman, Minnesota
- Hillman Township, Morrison County, Minnesota
- Hillman Township, Kanabec County, Minnesota
- Hillman, Montana
- Hillman, Western Australia
- Hillman City, Seattle, a neighborhood in Seattle, Washington
- Hillman Creek, a stream in Minnesota

=== Fictional places ===
- Hillman College, the fictional college attended on A Different World

== People ==
- Arthur James Hillman (1884–1922), Western Australian engineer
- Ammon Hillman (born 1971), American classicist
- Bones Hillman (1958–2020), New Zealand musician
- Brandyn Hillman (born 2005), American football player
- Brenda Hillman (born 1951), American poet and translator
- Chris Hillman (born 1944), American musician, member of The Byrds
- Clarence Dayton Hillman (1870–1935), American businessman and real estate developer
- Colin Hillman (1961–2009), Welsh rugby coach
- Darnell Hillman (born 1949), American basketball player
- Dave Hillman (1927–2022), American bseeball player
- David Hillman (tenor) (1934–2009), English operatic tenor
- Earle M. Hillman (1902–1975), American politician
- Elizabeth Hillman, British professor of biomedical engineering
- Eric Hillman (born 1966), American baseball player
- Elsie Hillman (1925–2015), American philanthropist and donor to the Republican party
- Floyd Hillman (1933–2020), Canadian professional ice hockey player
- George Hillman (1867–1932), British surgeon and MP
- Gordon Hillman (1943–2018), British archaeobotanist
- Gracia Hillman, chairwoman of the U.S. Election Assistance Commission
- Harold Hillman (1930–2016), British biologist
- Harry Hillman (1881–1945), American athlete and Olympic medalist
- Henry Hillman (1918–2017), American businessman and philanthropist
- Jack Hillman (1871–1952), English football goalkeeper
- James Hillman (1926–2011), American psychologist and author
- Jennifer A. Hillman (born 1957), American law professor
- John Hillman (disambiguation), several people
- Joyce Hillman or Joyce Hillman-Kortum (1936–2019), American politician from Nebraska
- Larry Hillman (1937–2022), Canadian ice hockey player
- Mark Hillman (born 1967), Colorado state treasurer
- Nina Hillman (born 2005), American singer and former child actress based in Japan
- Noel Lawrence Hillman (born 1956), United States District Judge
- Ponsie Barclay Hillman (1918–2008), New York activist
- Reed V. Hillman (born 1948), American police officer and politician
- Ronnie Hillman (1991–2022), American football player
- Shmuel Yitzchak Hillman (1868–1953), Lithuanian-born Orthodox Jewish Talmudic scholar and rabbi
- Sidney Hillman (1887–1946), American labor leader
- Trey Hillman (born 1963), American professional baseball coach
- William Hillman (1848–1921), English bicycle and car manufacturer

=== Fictional characters ===
- Richard Hillman, character in British TV Soap Opera Coronation Street
- Teri Hillman, character in the comic series Peter Parker
- Hillman Hunter (The Hitchhiker's Guide to the Galaxy), character in the novel And Another Thing... by Eoin Colfer

== Other ==
- Hillman Periodicals, a magazine and comic book publishing company
- Hillman Library, at University of Pittsburgh
- Hillman Solutions, a hardware manufacturer

== See also ==
- Hillmon
- Hilman (disambiguation)
