= Isaac Cathcart =

Isaac Cathcart (c. 1845–1909) was a well-known businessman and Snohomish County, Washington, pioneer.

Cathcart was born in County Fermanagh, Ireland, in about 1845. He was the son of Isaac F. and Charlott (Bushfield) Cathcart.

He migrated to the Pacific Northwest, settling in the area now called Cathcart after him. There, he was a local logger, hotel-keeper and county treasurer. He ran the Snohomish Exchange Hotel. He was one of the organizers of the Snohomish Skykomish and Spokane Railway and Transportation Company in 1891. His large land holdings were purchased by C.D. Hillman, who platted and sold the lots, eventually creating Cathcart and Clearview.

== Sources ==
- Biography citing History of the Pacific Northwest, Oregon and Washington, 1889
- Obituary
- Snohomish county localities
- mention of Exchange Hotel
- Lawsuit
