= Hilman =

People:

- Helianti Hilman, Indonesian lawyer
- Oscar Hilman (born 1950), U.S. Army bigadier general
- Hilman Walker (October 10, 1912 – May 1983) was an American football player and coach.

== See also ==
- Hillman (disambiguation)
