= Clarisse Iribagiza =

Rwandan computer scientist and co-founder of HeHe Limited

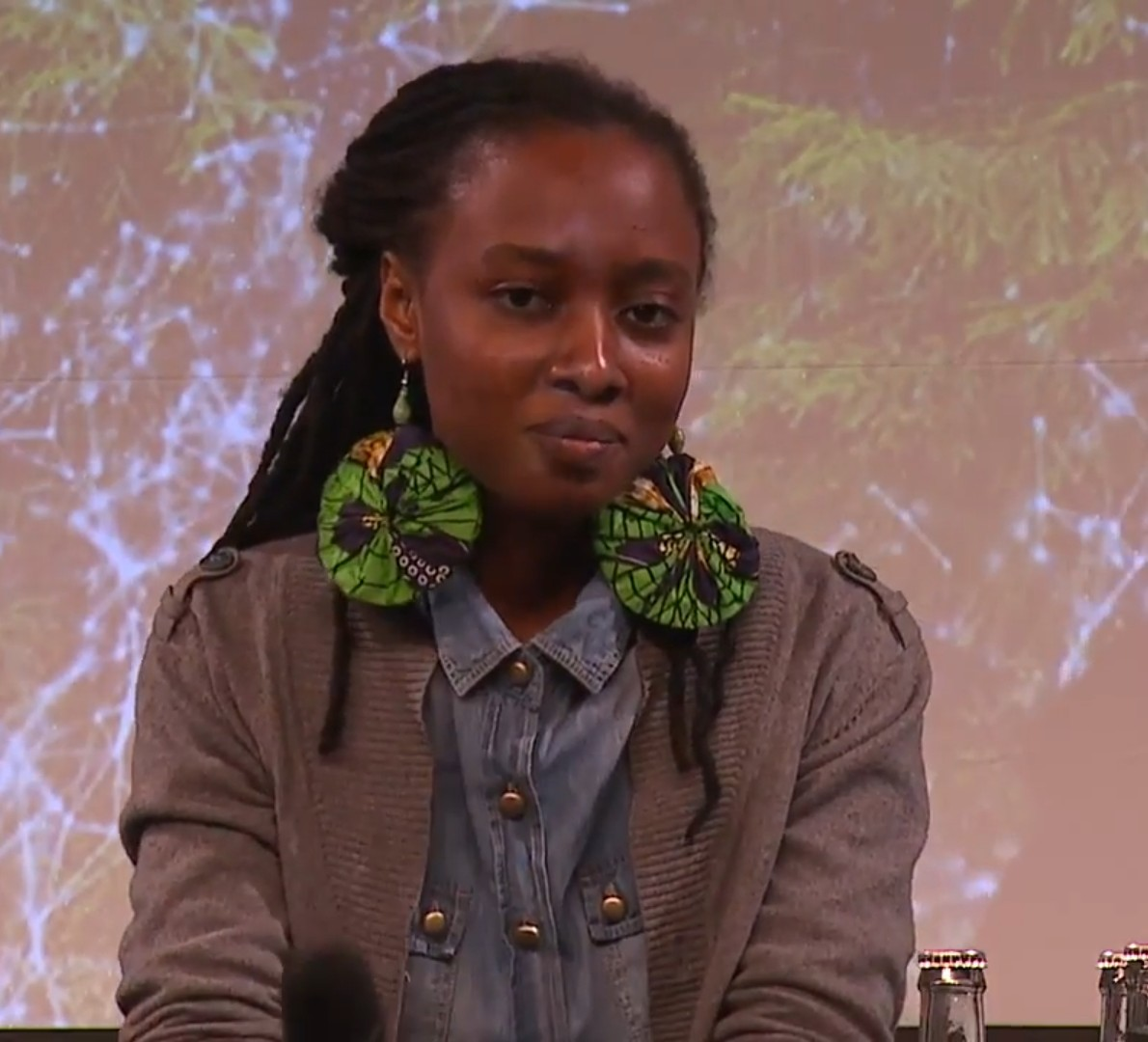
- Born: 28 January 1988 (age 38)
- Citizenship: Rwanda
- Education: University of Rwanda, College of Science and Technology (B.Sc. in Computer Engineering); African Leadership University, School of Business (MBA in Business); Arizona State University (PhD in Innovation in Global Development)
- Occupation: Researcher at Arizona State University
- Years active: 2010–present
- Known for: Digital transformation
- Notable work: Founded Hehe Limited

Clarisse Iribagiza (born 28 January 1988) is a computer scientist in Rwanda. She is the CEO and co-founder of the mobile technology company HeHe Limited, and one of the UNCTAD's seven "eTrade for Women Advocates from the developing world".

== Early life and education ==
Clarisse Iribagiza was born on 28 January 1988.

Iribagiza attended the University of Rwanda’s College of Science and Technology and she attended a short Massachusetts Institute of Technology (MIT) incubation program.

== Career ==
Iribagiza founded her mobile technology company, HeHe Limited, whilst still an undergraduate. By 2019, it had grown to have two million customers. The company works with local suppliers and they get access to an online store for their goods, inventory maintenance and they receive digital payments from their end customers. HeHe Labs partnered with GirlHub, in an initiative that aims to inspire ambition in Rwandan girls. They teach them about not just ICT, but technology and design in general and in critical thinking.

She is a researcher at Arizona State University, United States.

== Recognition and awards ==
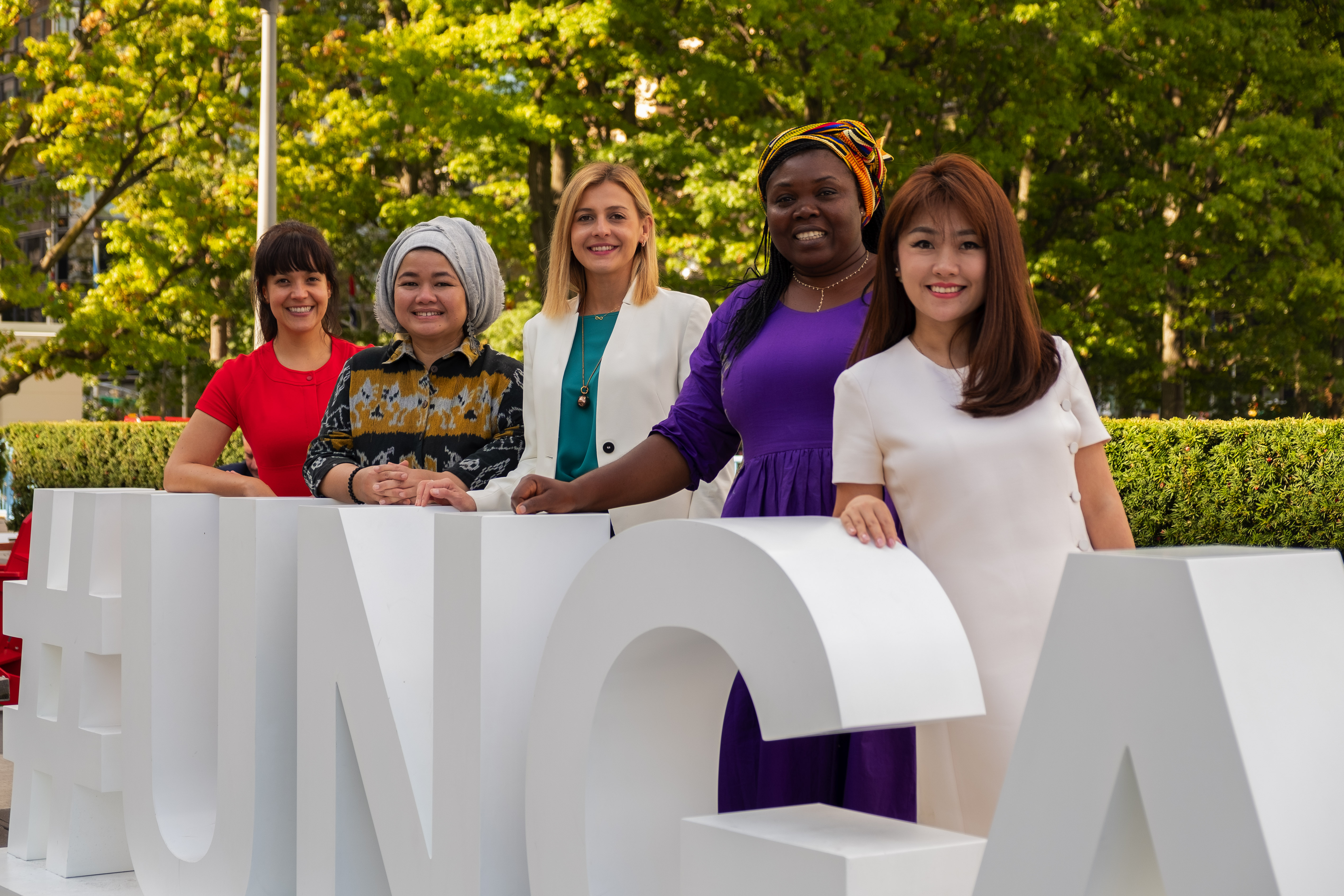
L to R: The other winners of her UNCTAD award Claudia de Heredia, Helianti Hilman, Nina Angelovska, Patricia Zoundi Yao, and Xiaofei Yao

- Iribagiza was the winner of the East African entrepreneur reality TV show Inspire Africa, Season 1.
- In 2012, she was one of the "20 movers and shakers of Africa" named at the continent CEO Summit, and the following year Jeannette Kagame, the First Lady of Rwanda recognised her as one of the Imbuto Foundation's "Celebrating Young Rwandan Achievers".
- In 2015, she was named in Forbes Africa's 30 Under 30 list.
- In 2017, she was named as one of OkayAfrica's 100 Women. Irabagiza sits on the African Development Bank's Presidential Youth Advisory Group.
- On 24 September 2019, the United Nations Conference on Trade and Development (UNCTAD ) announced seven "eTrade for Women Advocates" from the developing world. Irabagiza was named and the others were Nina Angelovska, Nazanin Daneshvar, Xiaofei Yao, Patricia Zoundi Yao, Claudia de Heredia and Helianti Hilman. It was announced on the periphery of the United Nations General Assembly in New York but Irabagiza was one of two who did not attend the award ceremony.
- She was selected as a Karman Fellow in 2021 for her work in space.
- An Italian think tank, LSDP (Lo Spazio della Politica), named Iribagiza among their top 100 global thinkers.

== Personal life ==
Iribagiza in her free time plays a guitar and has composed some songs.

== See also ==
- Eugène Mutimura
