= Clearview, Washington =

- CDP
- Location of Clearview, Washington.
- Coordinates: 47°49′45″N 122°8′43″W
- Country: United States
- State: Washington
- County: Snohomish

Area
  - Total: 4.64 sq mi (12.01 km^{2})
  - Land: 4.64 sq mi (12.01 km^{2})
  - Water: 0 sq mi (0.00 km^{2})

Population (2010)
  - Total: 3,324
  - Density: 717/sq mi (276.7/km^{2})
- Time zone: UTC-8 (Pacific (PST))
  - Summer (DST): UTC-7 (PDT)
- GNIS feature ID: 1512097

Clearview is a small unincorporated community and census-designated place (CDP) in Snohomish County, Washington, United States. As of the 2020 census, Clearview had a population of 3,648. Clearview is located on the west side of State Route 9, where it intersects 180th Street SE (once known as Vine Street) in Snohomish County, Washington, United States. It is located between Snohomish and Woodinville and the top of the Clearview Hill.

== History ==
Clearview was established on timberland that once belonged to Isaac Cathcart and had been logged by the Snohomish Logging Company. Clarence Dayton Hillman obtained the logged property and platted it in 1913 as Cathcart Division #1.

There were no roads in the area, so Mr. Hillman eagerly offered right-of-way when the Snohomish Fruit Growers Association sought a shorter route to Seattle. After much controversy, this road was completed in 1925. Now known as Highway 9, the road was initially called the Woodinville Cut-off.

By the time the road opened, the Hillman Company had constructed a real estate building, cannery, café and combination gas station-store along it. As an inducement for settlement, new residents were hired to clear land and build houses or gas stations on various company tracts. To convey the impression of self-sufficiency on small plots, the company established a rabbitry, pigeon and squab farm and poultry model-farm with resident "experts." Other inducements were free berry vines, fruit trees and plants. Land was donated for a church and a community hall.

The settlement was first called West Cathcart and then Cathcart Heights. The 1930 Census lists 624 residents in Cathcart. On Armistice Day 1931 a celebration was held in recognition of the new name of Clearview. This name, possibly proposed by merchants Albert and Lea DesMarais, fittingly described the fine views residents had of the Cascade Mountains.

When the national Depression began, local businesses included Albert DesMarais Butcher Shop, Store and Gas Station, D'Aigle's Grocery, Phillips Store and Gas Station, Bluebird Café, Pigeon Lodge Dance Hall and several gas stations. Other businesses that evolved were firewood (six partners), cordwood (five partners) and Christmas tree contracting (2 individuals). Eventually, a church was built on the Hillman donation and another on land given by George Robinson.

The community was in constant change as residents came and went. Times were economically desperate for many families. The gas stations changed owners frequently, but the other businesses were stable.

Development began in other parts of the plat and adjacent areas. Gilbert's Corner, Pigeon Lodge, Berry Brook Farms, Woodshire, Sherwood, Roosevelt Plains and City Farms all appeared. Growth continued in spurts and many businesses came and went.

Two major buildings, the Midway and the Begis Trading Center, were built. Three concrete block buildings also arose and housed various businesses. The business center gradually began to expand north along the highway. Northwest of Clearview is the Willis Tucker County Park.

Aside from the CDP, which was established at the 2010 census, the boundaries of this unincorporated community are not well-defined. Services such as education, mail and water are provided by various districts. Fire District #7 serves 46 square miles (120 km^{2}) and the main station is at Clearview.

== Geography ==
Clearview is located at 47°49′45″N 122°8′43″W (47.829186, -122.145149).

According to the United States Census Bureau, the CDP has a total area of 4.639 square miles (12.01 km^{2}), all of it land.

== Demographics ==
Historical population
Census	Pop.	Note	%±
2010	3,324		—
2020	3,648		9.7%
U.S. Decennial Census; 2000 2010

Clearview first appeared as a census designated place in the 2010 U.S. census formed from parts of Cathcart and Maltby CDPs and parts of the deleted North Creek and Seattle Hill-Silver Firs CDPs.

=== Racial and ethnic composition ===
Clearview CDP, Washington – Racial and ethnic composition Note: the US Census treats Hispanic/Latino as an ethnic category. This table excludes Latinos from the racial categories and assigns them to a separate category. Hispanics/Latinos may be of any race.
Race / Ethnicity (NH = Non-Hispanic)	Pop 2010	Pop 2020	% 2010	% 2020
White alone (NH)	2,919	2,724	87.82%	74.67%
Black or African American alone (NH)	10	39	0.30%	1.07%
Native American or Alaska Native alone (NH)	18	15	0.54%	0.41%
Asian alone (NH)	88	169	2.65%	4.63%
Native Hawaiian or Pacific Islander alone (NH)	15	15	0.45%	0.41%
Other race alone (NH)	7	19	0.21%	0.52%
Mixed race or Multiracial (NH)	79	302	2.38%	8.28%
Hispanic or Latino (any race)	188	365	5.66%	10.01%
Total	3,324	3,648	100.00%	100.00%
