= Xiaofei Yao =

Chinese businesswoman

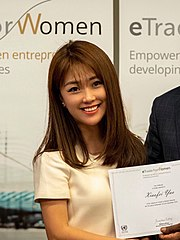
- Other names: Faye Yao
- Occupation: e-Commerce CEO
- Known for: CEO of Rogrand pharmaceuticals e-commerce company

Xiaofei Yao is the Chinese e-commerce CEO of Rogrand - a company involved in pharmaceuticals e-commerce.

== Life ==
She is the founder and CEO of Rogrand E-commerce. Rogrand E-commerce is based in Beijing and has eight other offices in China in Shandong, Hubei, Guangdong, Shanxi, Liaoning, Sichuan, Zhejiang and Henan. In 2016 her company launched an initiative at a conference in Lima to tie together partners in the Chinese pharmaceutical market including manufacturers, pharmacies and hospitals to manage chronic diseases using on-line resources. She emphasises the importance of data to ambitious companies.

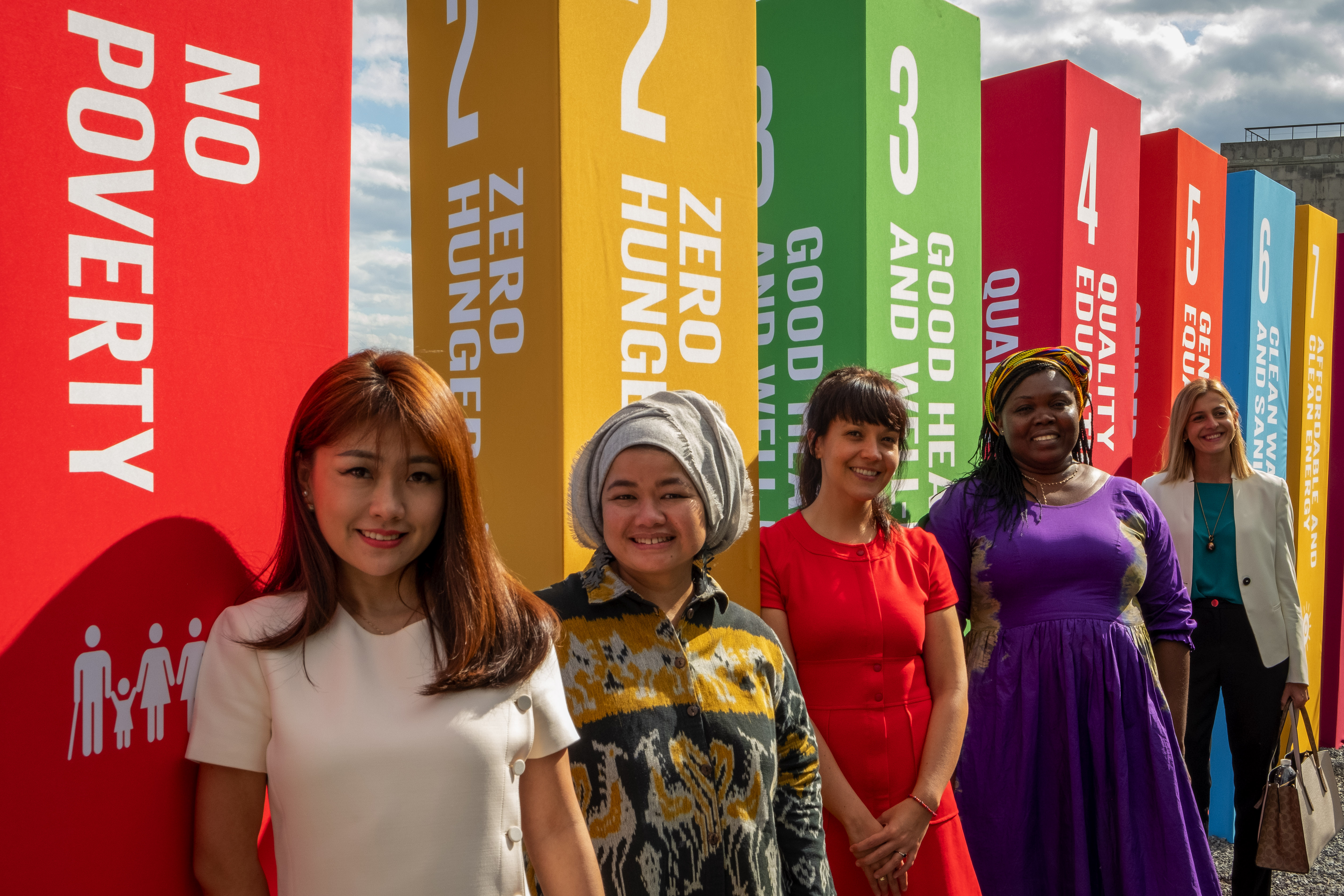
L to R: Xiaofei Yao, Helianti Hilman, Claudia de Heredia, Patricia Zoundi Yao and Nina Angelovska

In September 2019 the United Nations Conference on Trade and Development announced seven "eTrade for Women Advocates" from the developing world. The others were Nazanin Daneshvar, Clarisse Iribagiza, Patricia Zoundi Yao, Nina Angelovska, Claudia de Heredia and Helianti Hilman from Indonesia. The awards were announced on the periphery of the United Nations General Assembly in New York and she was one of the five winners who were present.
