= Kennydale, Renton, Washington =

Neighborhood in Renton, Washington, United States

Coordinates: 47°31′15″N 122°12′20″W

Kennydale is a neighborhood in Renton, Washington, in the United States. As of 2008, it had an estimated population of 4,840. It lies along the southeastern shore of Lake Washington and straddles Interstate 405 which runs north-south between Renton and Bellevue, and borders the Newport Shores neighborhood of Bellevue. The part of the neighborhood on the lake (west) side of I-405 is referred to as "Lower Kennydale", and on the east side "Upper Kennydale".

Lower Kennydale is situated on land which slopes from I-405 to a shoreline on Lake Washington that forms a westward bulge terminating at Coleman Point. This configuration affords a 180° over-water view of the I-90 East Channel bridge (4 miles distant) and the skyscrapers in downtown Bellevue (7 miles) to the north, the south end of Mercer Island (less than 1 mile) and the Rainier Beach neighborhood of south Seattle (3 miles) to the west, and the large Renton Boeing plant at the south end of Lake Washington (3 miles) to the south. It is located at exit 6 I-405.

Kennydale was one of many communities laid out in the Seattle area between 1898 and 1910 by real estate developer Clarence Dayton Hillman (1870–1935). Hillman would typically buy large tracts of land cleared by logging and sell it as lots. Kennydale was one of his first land developments and was started in 1898 as the "Lake Washington Garden of Eden". He named Kennydale for his wife Bessie, whose maiden name was "Kenny."

In late 2005, Barbee Mill, a lumber mill on Kennydale's Lake Washington waterfront that had been inactive since 2002, auctioned off its equipment and began building demolition and land remediation. It was the site of a planned subdivision. The sale of the land was finalized in September 2006 and construction began on the development of the community of 114 luxury townhouses by longtime Eastside builder, Conner Homes Co.

On May 7, 2006, the Seattle Seahawks of the National Football League announced plans to construct a new team headquarters and training facility on land already owned by team owner Paul Allen in the Kennydale neighborhood on a parcel of land near the former Barbee Mill along Lake Washington. Construction began in October 2006 and the facility was completed in the summer of 2008.
