= Nina Angelovska =

Macedonian politician

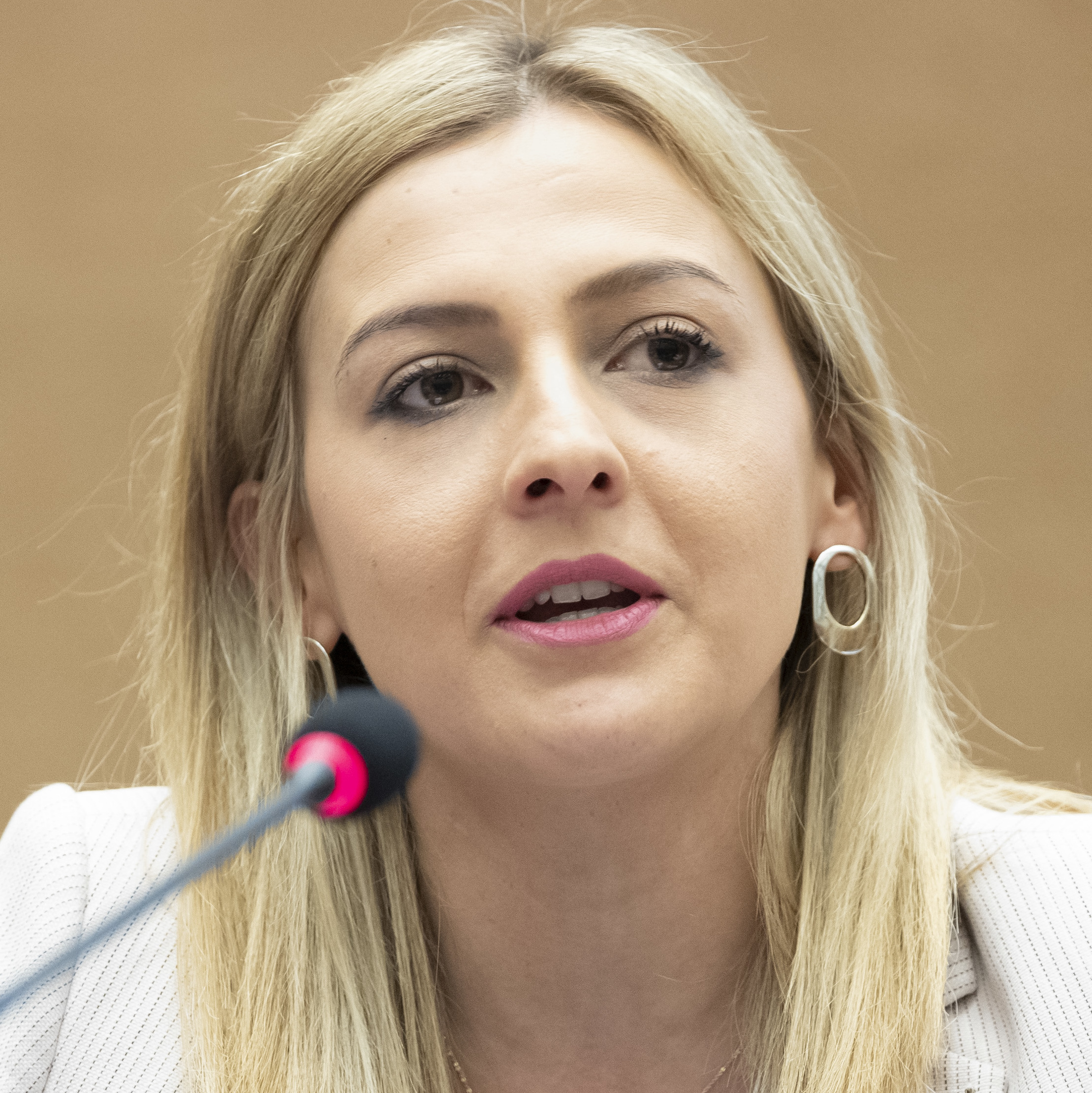
- Nina Angelovska in 2019
- Born: 13 July 1988 (age 37); Skopje, SR Macedonia, SFR Yugoslavia (now North Macedonia)
- Education: PhD in Management at the Ss. Cyril and Methodius University of Skopje
- Occupations: politician, entrepreneur
- Known for: Entrepreneur, E-commerce, Digital Economy, Minister of Finance
- Political party: Social Democratic Union of Macedonia

Nina Angelovska (born 13 July 1988 in Skopje) was the Minister of Finance in North Macedonia. She is also an entrepreneur, UNCTAD eTrade for Women Advocate and president of the Macedonian E-commerce Association. She co-founded and led the first deal platform and e-commerce company in Macedonia, Grouper.mk. She made a successful exit when the Polish Group Asseco SEE acquired her company, Grouper.mk.

== Early life and career ==
Angelovska was educated in Skopje at the Ss. Cyril and Methodius University where she obtained bachelor's and master's degrees in E-business at the Faculty of Economics. Angelovska graduated as student of the year and was awarded Frank Manning for best student in the generation in economic sciences in 2010. Angelovska won a national contest for most innovative business plan and co-founded Grouper.mk in 2011, known as the first Macedonian deal platform and a leading Macedonian e-commerce company. Angelovska obtained her doctorate degree in 2016 in Management at her alma mater.

Before joining the Government, Angelovska was heading Grouper.mk as a CEO and was also working as a consultant in digital economy, business development and e-commerce. Grouper employed 20 people and had 200,000 customers in 2018.

In 2016 Angelovska was recognized in 100 Female Founders in Europe, a list composed by the German startup magazine The Hundert. In 2018 she was named Forbes 30 Under 30 in E-commerce and Retail for Europe. In 2019 UNCTAD recognized her as one of the seven global advocates for Women in eTrade.

== Political career ==
In August 2019 Angelovska was appointed Minister of Finance in North Macedonia. She was appointed by the Prime Minister Zoran Zaev who had previously surprised critics by undertaking the finance role in addition to that of prime minister.

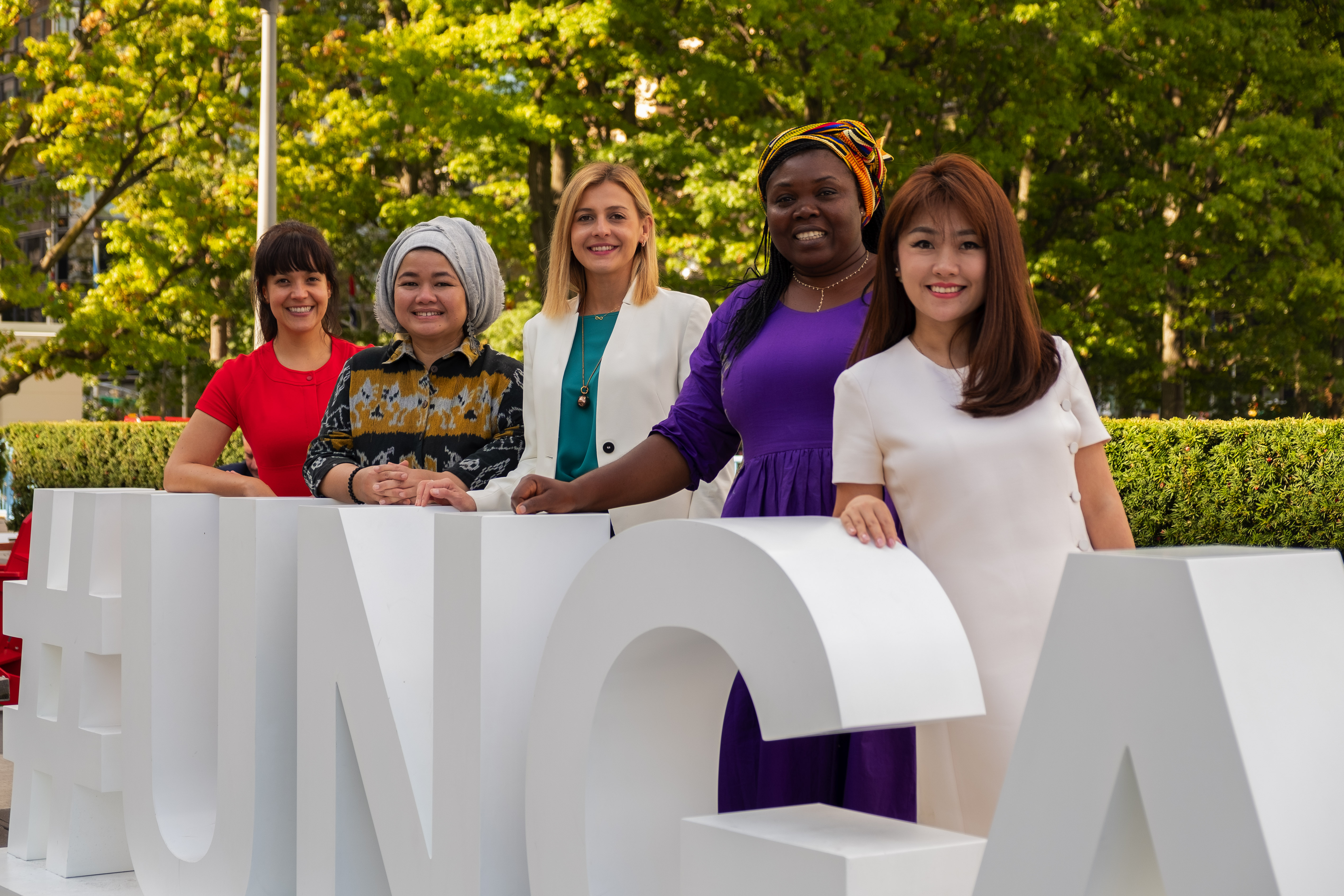
L to R: Claudia de Heredia, Helianti Hilman, Nina Angelovska, Patricia Zoundi Yao and Xiaofei Yao

On 24 September 2019 the United Nations Conference on Trade and Development announced seven "eTrade for Women Advocates" from the developing world. The others were Nazanin Daneshvar, Clarisse Iribagiza, Xiaofei Yao, Patricia Zoundi Yao, Claudia de Heredia and Helianti Hilman. It was announced on the periphery of the United Nations General Assembly in New York.

Angelovska interviewed Candace Nkoth Bisseck about "eTrade for Women Advocates" for Forbes in 2020. Her 2020 budget for North Macedonia increased spending by 50% investing in human capital (health, education etc.) whilst planning to also cut the national debt in relation to GNP.

== Other activities ==
- European Bank for Reconstruction and Development (EBRD), Ex-Officio Member of the Board of Governors (since 2019)

== Recognition ==
- Angelovska graduated the best student of the year in 2010 and was awarded Frank Manning for best student of the generation in economic sciences.
- In 2018 Angelovska was named one of the Forbes 30 Under 30 in Europe.
- In 2019 Angelovska was named one of the seven global UNCTAD advocates for Women in eTrade
