= Claudia de Heredia =

Mexican e-commerce entrepreneur

Claudia de Heredia Romo
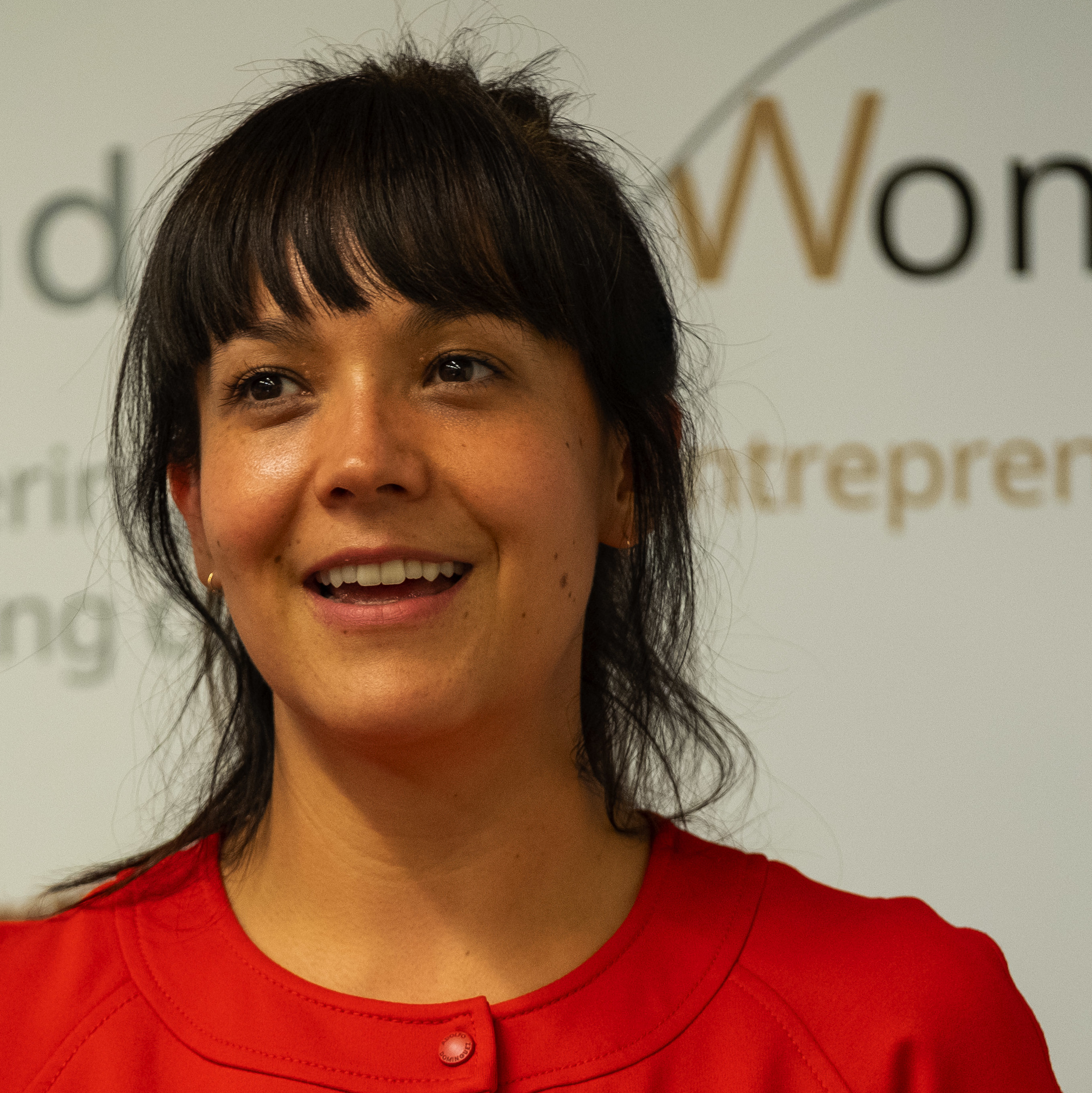
- in 2019
- Born: 28 August 1982; Mexico City
- Known for: e-commerce in Mexico

Claudia de Heredia Romo (born 28 August 1982) is a Mexican e-commerce entrepreneur.

== Life ==
Romo was born in Mexico City. She took a degree in marketing at Tecnológico de Monterrey Campus Santa Fe and graduated in 2006. She then worked in Procter & Gamble in México until 2009.

In 2012 she, together with Jennifer Marquard and Claudio del Conde, founded Kichink. Its success was based on the relative reliability of the Mexican postal service and the average customer's perceived distrust of on-line payments.

In 2015, Google celebrated its Demo Day and Kichink was one of the 11 applications made by startups founded or co-founded by women. de Heredia represented Kichink as co-founder during the event in Silicon Valley. She had four minutes to make a pitch followed by two questions. Kichink was not the winner but it received the Game Changer Award for Innovative Entrepreneurship.

As director of marketing of Kichink, she was part of the program "Young Leaders of the Americas" where seven entrepreneurs from Latin America met over two weeks technology companies, business incubators and accelerators in Seattle.

De Heredia was also a speaker at the panel The Impact of Technology on Services Delivery: Policy Changes in 2016 during the Asia-Pacific Economic Cooperation Forum held in Arequipa, Peru. In 2017, Claudia de Heredia participated in the Innovating and Scaling Across Markets panel during eMERGE Americas based in Miami.

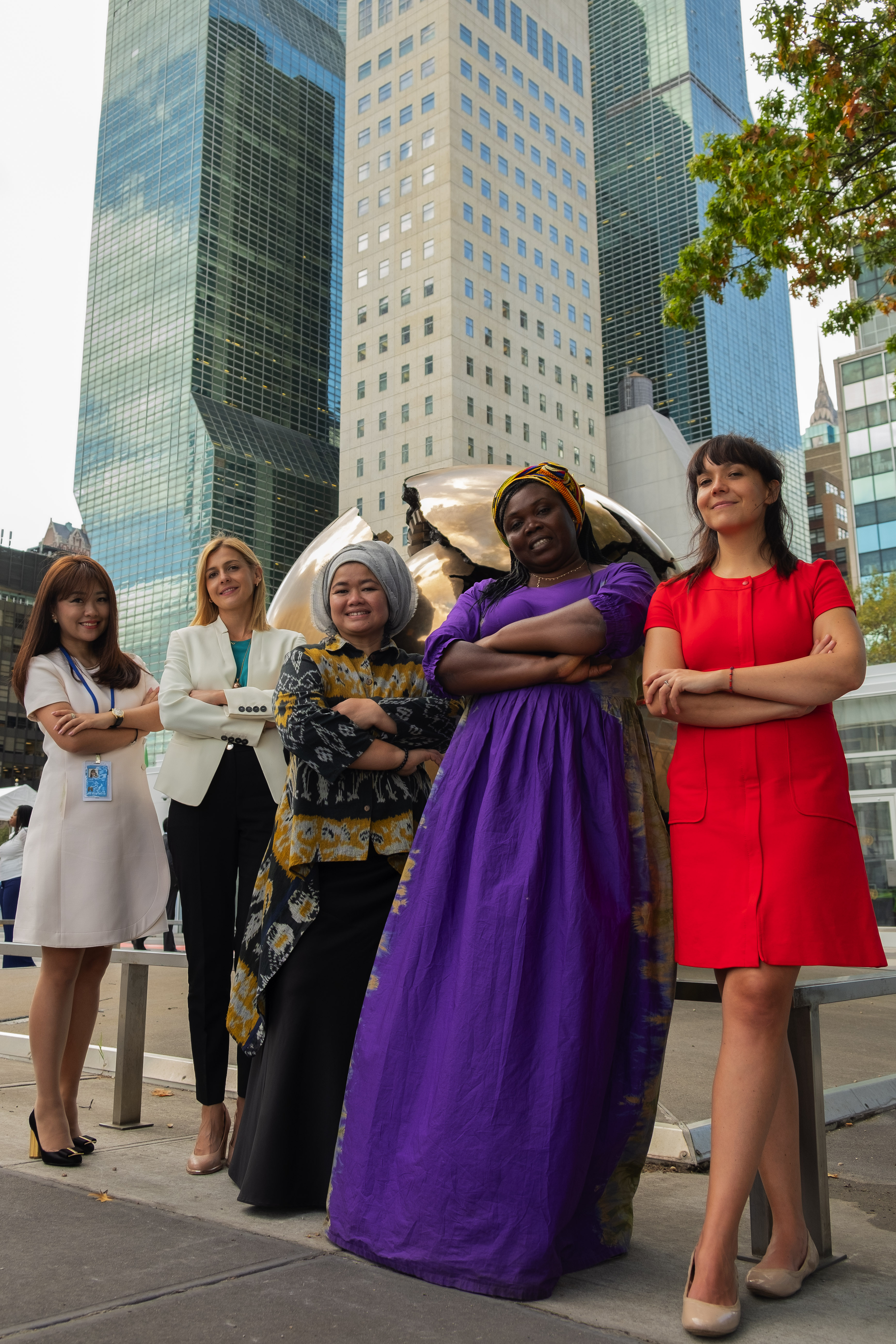
L to R Xiaofei Yao, Nina Angelovska, Helianti Hilman.Patricia Zoundi Yao and de Heredia at the UNCTAD event in 2019

In September 2019 the United Nations Conference on Trade and Development announced seven "eTrade for Women Advocates" from the developing world. The others were Nazanin Daneshvar, Clarisse Iribagiza, Patricia Zoundi Yao, Nina Angelovska and Helianti Hilman from Indonesia. The awards were announced on the periphery of the United Nations General Assembly in New York and she was one of the five winners who were present.
