= Nazanin Daneshvar =

Iranian Internet entrepreneur

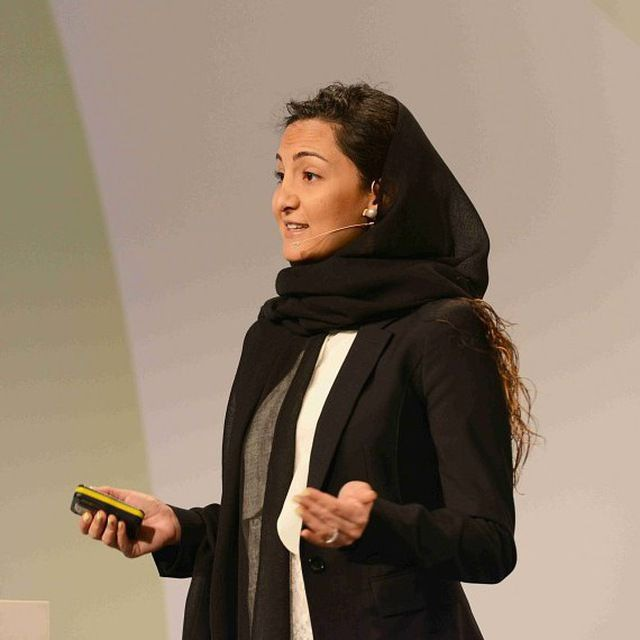
- Born: December 7, 1983 (age 42); Tehran, Iran
- Education: Amirkabir University of Technology
- Occupations: Entrepreneur, Venture Capitalist, Angel Investor

Nazanin Daneshvar (born in 1983, Tehran) is an Iranian Internet entrepreneur. She is the founder of Takhfifan, Iran's first and leading discount & cashback platform, and currently a General Partner at Angel Invest Fund, Europe’s most active angel fund. She became one of UNCTAD's "eTrade for Women Advocates" from the developing world.

== Life ==
Daneshvar was born in Tehran in 1983 and went to grad school in Tehran. After that, she worked as a developer and later in senior technical roles in London and Berlin before founding Takhfifan.

Before starting Takhfifan, Daneshvar founded Meydoonak.com, Iran’s first online grocery delivery platform, which launched in 2010.

When Daneshvar started Takhfifan, she was on her own as there were no other female website entrepreneurs she could compete against. She faced a lot of skepticism from potential business contacts, and she had to take her father along for the first year, as they would not believe she was in charge. The company is very similar to Groupon but it operates in Iran. The site offers large discounts to potential buyers and then passes on discounts the suppliers offer. Despite her difficulties, she believes that Iran is improving and she has encouraged other Iranian emigrants to return to Iran and help it improve further.

Takhfifan was initially modeled after Groupon, offering online discount deals from local merchants. Over time, it expanded beyond group-buying to become a fintech and lendtech platform, connecting nearly 20 million customers with offline retailers through digital services including payment solutions and marketing tools.

In 2017, she was invited to speak at the fourth annual Global Female Leaders Summit in Berlin, where she explained the challenges that she has faced. She went on to lead a discussion about cultural glass ceilings and the possibilities and opportunities facing women managers in Iran. One of the advantages of Iran at the moment is the sanctions created by other countries that limit imports and exports. With these sanctions in place then, it creates a hothouse for establishing local versions of other sites. She demonstrates her confidence by mentoring other women using the ten years of experience she has gained in e-commerce. The Takhfifan.com is the biggest female-founded company still operating in Teheran.

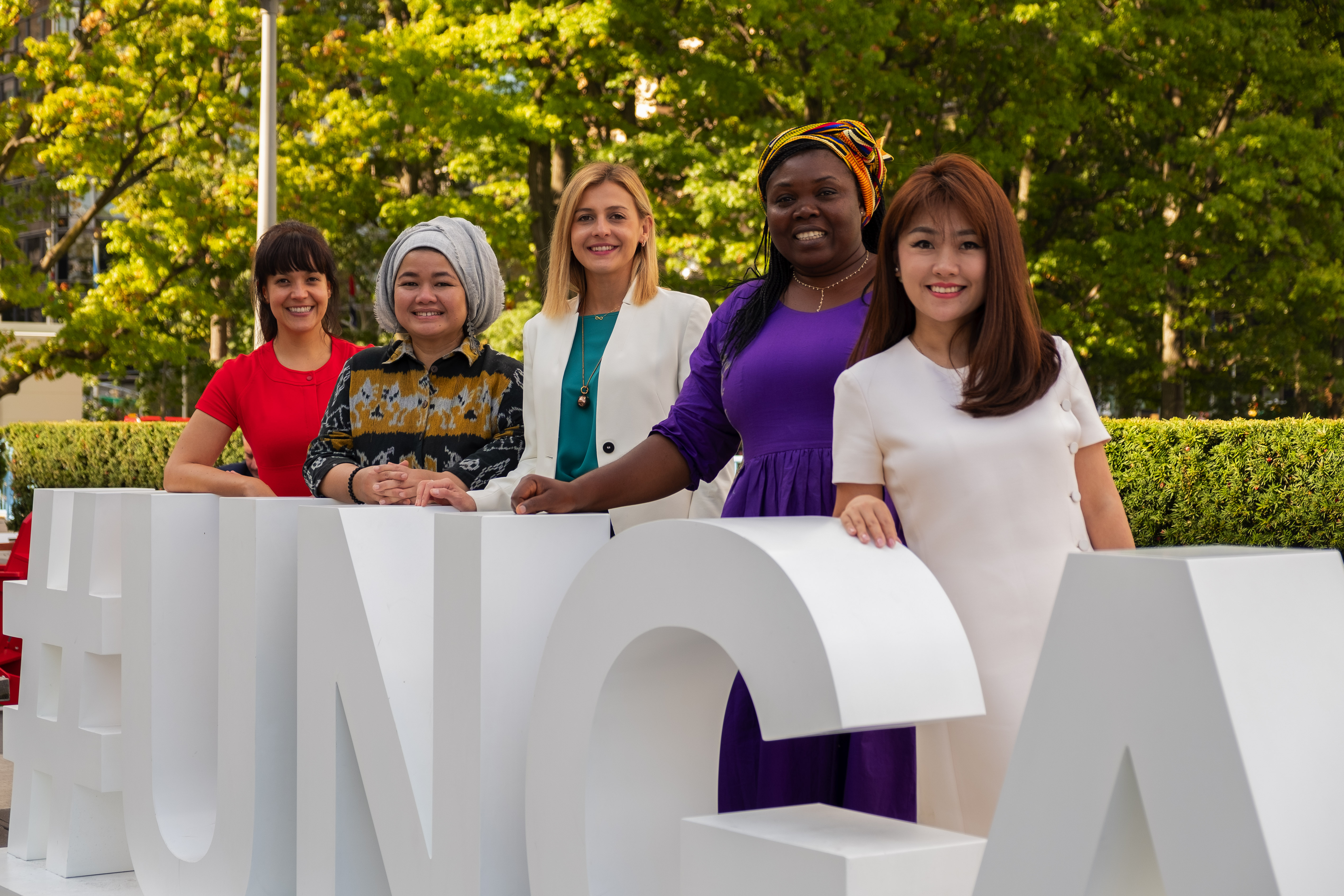
L to R: Five of the other winners of her award Claudia de Heredia, Helianti Hilman, Nina Angelovska, Patricia Zoundi Yao and Xiaofei Yao

In September 2019, the United Nations Conference on Trade and Development announced seven "eTrade for Women Advocates" from the developing world. Daneshvar was named and the others were Clarisse Iribagiza, Nina Angelovska, Xiaofei Yao, Patricia Zoundi Yao, Claudia de Heredia, and Helianti Hilman. The awards were announced on the periphery of the United Nations General Assembly in New York, but Daneshvar and Clarisse Iribagiza from Rwanda did not attend the award ceremony.

== Awards and recognition ==
In 2018, Daneshvar won the Asia-Pacific Young Entrepreneur Award under the auspices of CACCI (Confederation of Asia-Pacific Chambers of Commerce and Industry), representing the Iran Chamber of Commerce, Industries, Mines and Agriculture. It was the first time an entrepreneur from Iran received this award.

In 2023, Daneshvar was profiled in the book Influential Iranian Women, published by IranWire, which features the stories of 116 women who shaped modern Iranian society in fields such as science, art, politics, economy, and technology.
