= Patricia Zoundi Yao =

Entrepreneur from Cote d'ivoire

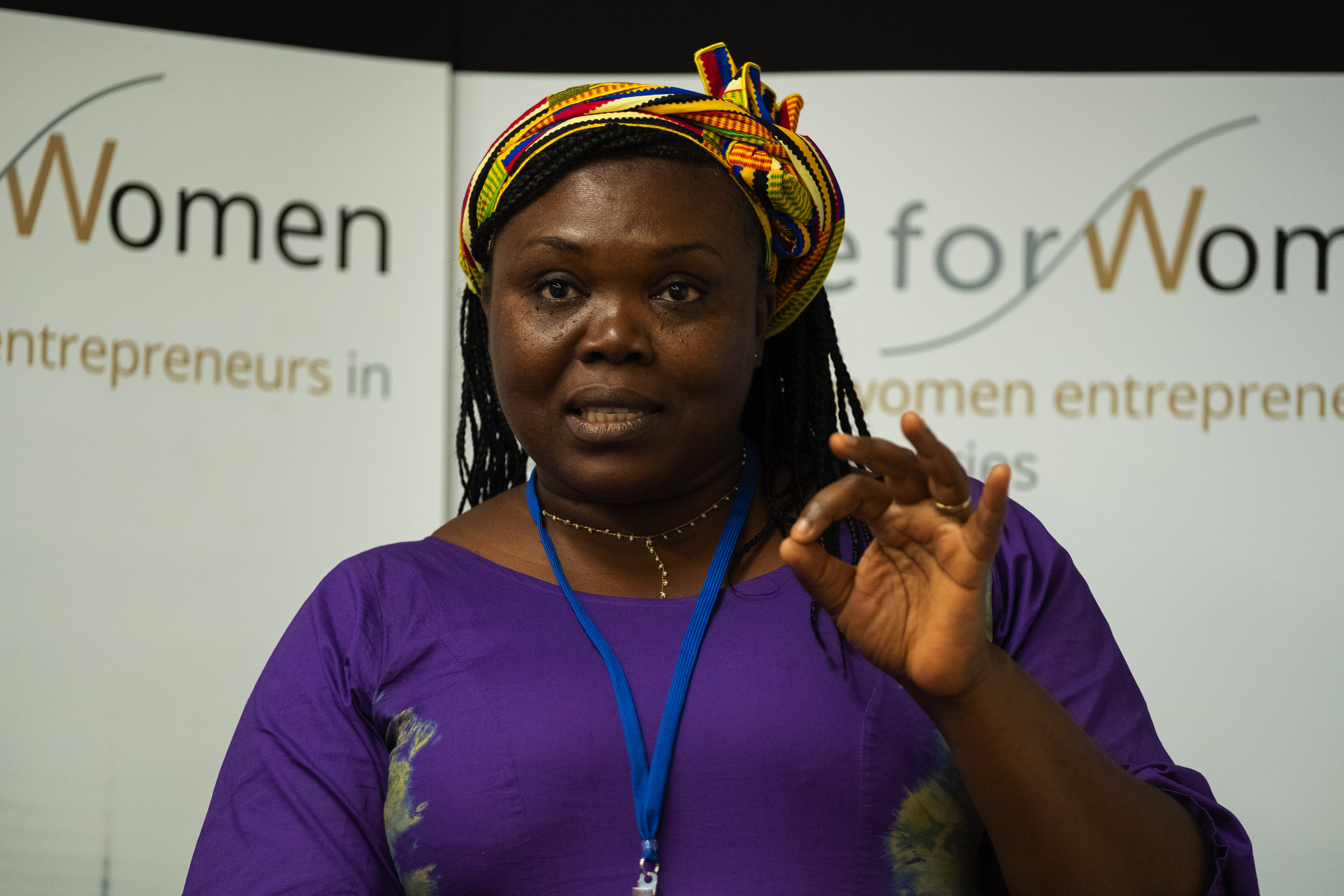
- Born: 1976 (age 49–50)
- Education: University of Ouagadougou
- Known for: e-commerce

Patricia Zoundi Yao (born in 1976 in Aboisso, Côte d'Ivoire) is a well-known social entrepreneur in Côte d'Ivoire. She is the founder of several companies, including Quickcash (fintech) and Canaan Land (agribusiness). Her determination and leadership was recognized by UNCTAD in September 2019 when she was one of seven "eTrade for Women Advocates".

== Education ==
She attended the University of Ouagadougou in Burkina Faso. Where she took business law. After leaving she helped her uncle found an unsuccessful business "Zenith Finances" based on the use of Western Union's business model. The experiment left her bankrupt.

== Quickcash ==
She decided that there was a business in lending to women in rural areas. They could not use modern systems (which rely on the internet) as they had no access to this technology. After two years of experimentation and the support of Fintech she developed a system that became Quickcash in 2010. This could achieve financial transactions without access to the internet. With just a mobile phone farmers could transfer cash quickly and securely.

She has launched two daughter companies - "Digital hub" is involved with allowing small vendors to accept small payments and Canaan Landwhich is involved in the agro-business. Her work has been supported by the minister for foreign affairs, Marcel Amon-Tanoh.

In November 2021, Patricia Zoundi Yao is preparing to sell her company QuickCash to a Nigerian buyer.

== Recognition ==
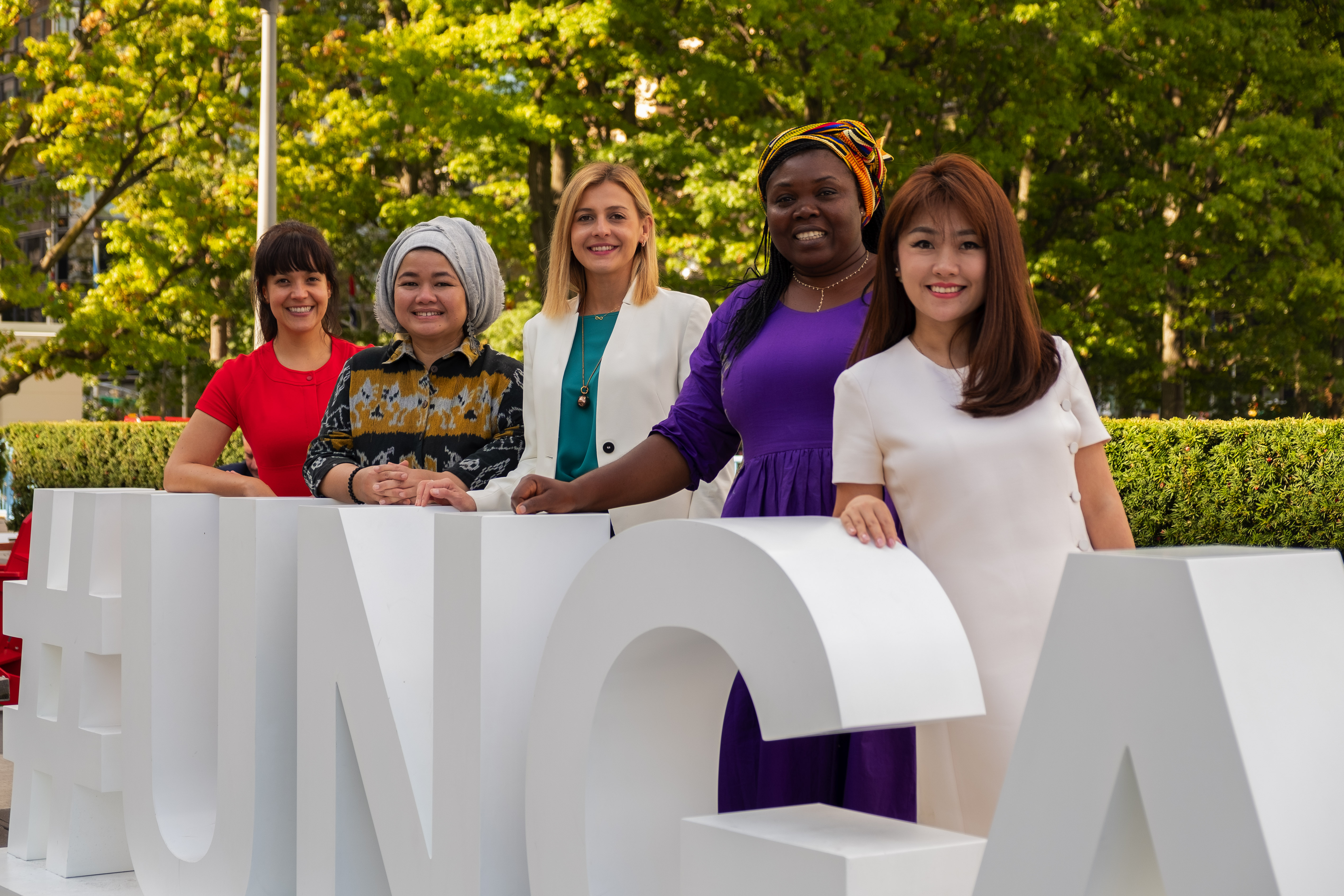
L to R: Claudia de Heredia, Helianti Hilman, Nina Angelovska, Patricia Zoundi Yao and Xiaofei Yao

On 24 September 2019 the United Nations Conference on Trade and Development announced seven "eTrade for Women Advocates" from the developing world. The others were Nazanin Daneshvar, Clarisse Iribagiza, Xiaofei Yao, Nina Angelovska, Claudia de Heredia and Helianti Hilman. It was announced on the periphery of the United Nations General Assembly in New York.
