= Clarence Dayton Hillman =

American businessman and real estate developer

Clarence Dayton Hillman (1870–1935) was a prominent businessman and real estate developer in Seattle, Washington, at the beginning of the 20th century.

Born in Birmingham, Michigan, his parents both died before he was ten years old. Quitting school after the second grade, he and his brother sold newspapers in Chicago, Illinois before heading west in 1891 to seek their fortunes in California.

Hillman headed north to Seattle in the late 1890s as the city was recovering from the Panic of 1893. Soon after his arrival the Klondike Gold Rush brought a surge of visitors and commerce to the area. By purchasing large tracts of land that had been recently logged around the city, and then sub-dividing that land and selling it to individuals, Hillman soon became one of the most successful businessmen in Seattle.

In 1910 a Seattle newspaper began printing stories about land buyers who were disgruntled with Hillman's sales tactics. There were instances in which the land's development potential had been exaggerated, and in some cases the land was sold to more than one person or was at the bottom of a lake. When Hillman started to use the mail to conduct these questionable practices, he was charged with the federal offense of mail fraud. He was convicted and, after the U.S. Supreme Court refused to hear the case, served 18 months of a 30-month sentence before rejoining his family in California and developing land in Paso Robles, San Diego, and Pasadena.

He died in 1935 while visiting his ranch at Paso Robles. He was buried in Seattle.

Hillman established the following communities:

- Boston Harbor, Washington
- Cathcart, Washington
- Clearview, Washington
- Hillman City, Seattle, Washington
- Kennydale, Washington
- Warm Beach, Washington
- Pacific, Washington
- Rainier Beach, Seattle, Washington

== Sources ==
- Wilma, David, "Hillman, Clarence Dayton (1870-1935)", HistoryLink.org, Essay 3080, March 10, 2001.

== Additional resources ==
- McAbee, J. Clark, "White River Rapscallion: An Insight into C. D. Hillman" White River Journal, October 2003.
- Wilma, David, "Hillman, Clarence Dayton (1870-1935)", HistoryLink.org, Essay 3080, March 10, 2001
