= Helianti Hilman =

Indonesian Lawyer

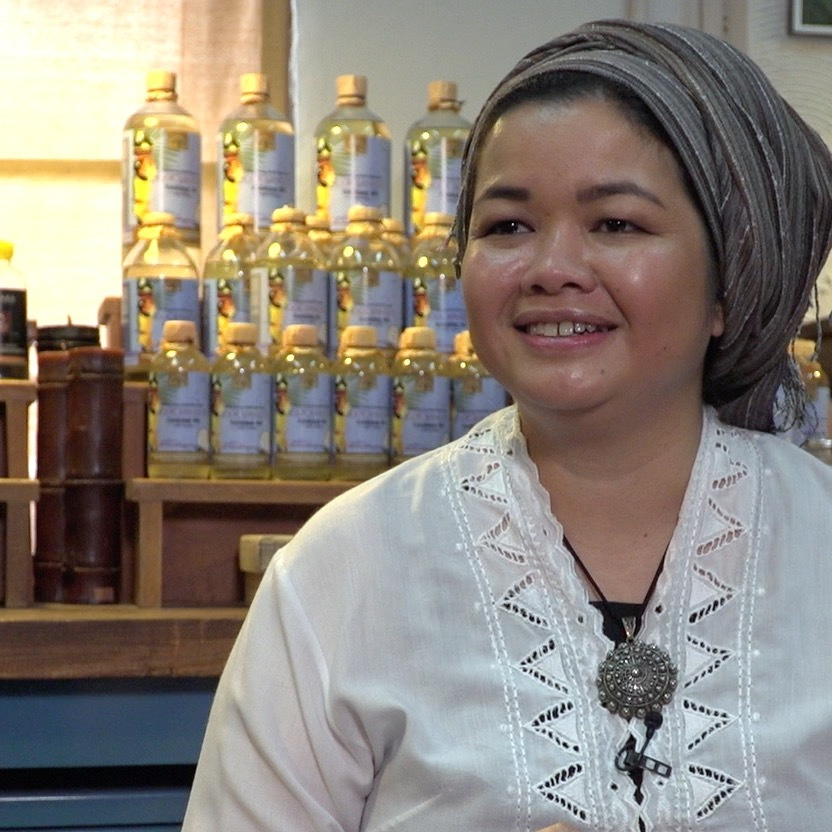
- in 2018
- Born: East Java
- Education: Padjadjaran University, King's College London
- Known for: CEO of Javara
- Spouse: Dian

Helianti Hilman (born ) is a lawyer involved in e-commerce in Indonesia with "Javara". The business's mission is to market indigenous Indonesian food products. In 2019 she became one of UNCTAD's "eTrade for Women Advocate".

== Life ==
Hilman was born in East Java and she was brought up there on a highland coffee plantation. She studied law at Padjadjaran University and then continued her studies at King's College London taking a master's degree in intellectual property law.

In 2014 she was a Forbes Indonesia Global Rising Star and in 2015 she was recognised as the Schwab Foundation's Social Entrepreneur of the Year.

In 2008 she formed Javara. The company is actually called PT Kampung Kearifan Indonesia and it uses modern technology to manage both its supply chain and its sales. The business's mission is to bring indigenous Indonesian food products to the market.

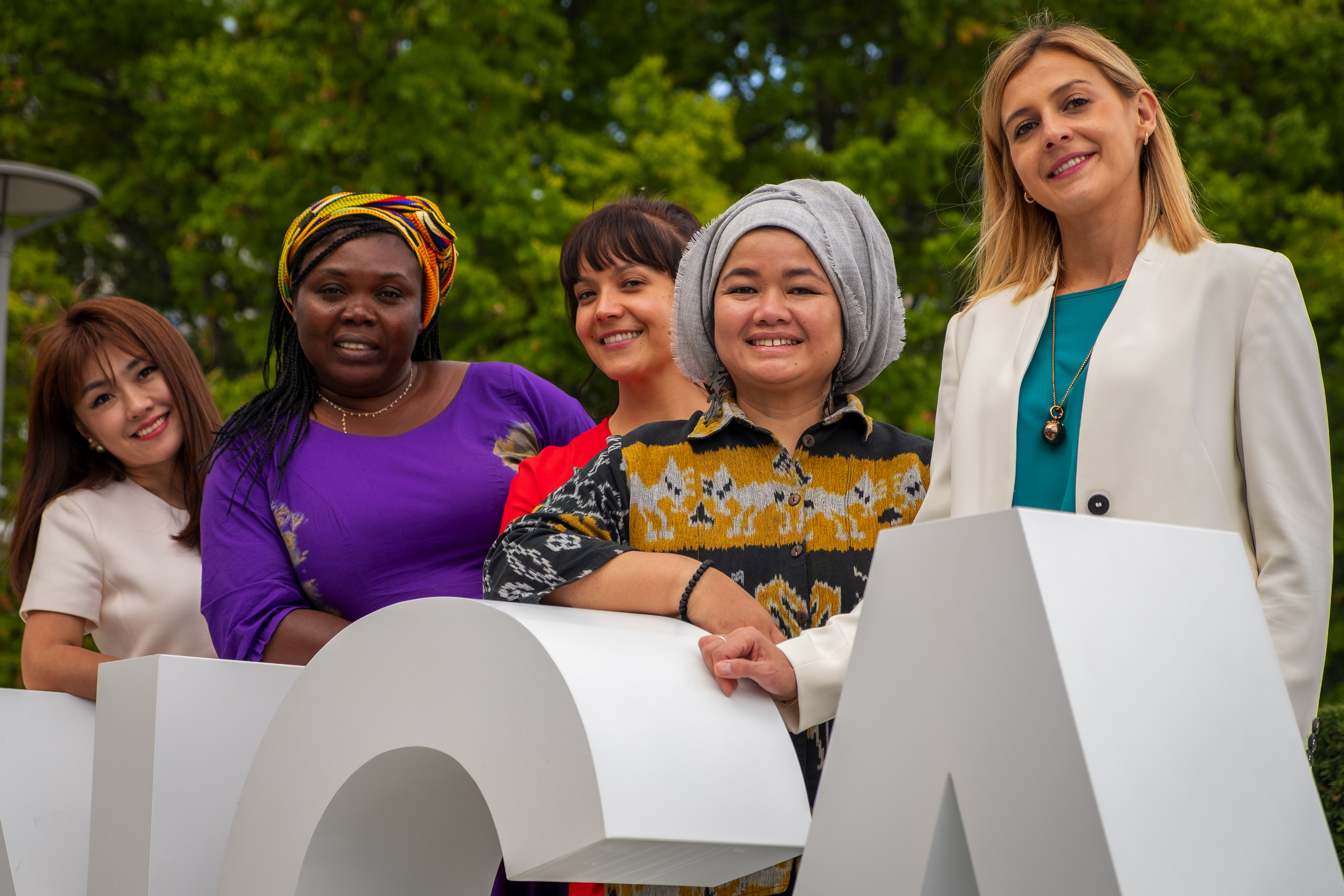
L to R: Xiaofei Yao, Patricia Zoundi Yao, Claudia de Heredia, Helianti Hilman and Nina Angelovska at the UN General Assembly

In September 2019 the United Nations Conference on Trade and Development announced seven "eTrade for Women Advocates" from the developing world. The awards were announced on the periphery of the United Nations General Assembly in New York. The other six were Nazanin Daneshvar, Clarisse Iribagiza, Patricia Zoundi Yao, Nina Angelovska, Claudia de Heredia and Xiaofei Yao. She was one of the five winners who were present.
