= Hillman, Georgia =

Unincorporated community in Georgia, U.S.

Coordinates: 33°36′03″N 82°47′52″W

Hillman is an unincorporated community in Taliaferro County, in the U.S. state of Georgia.

== History ==
The community was named after A. L. Hillman, a first settler. A post office called Hillman was established in 1887, and remained in operation until 1959.

The Georgia General Assembly incorporated the place in 1887 as the Town of Hillman. A couple of years later a hotel was built on the property and a small resort called The Rocks That Shock which was a collection of drilled out holes to dip the guests' feet in. The water from the underground water source was supposed to have healing effects. Andrew Hillman was sick and went mining for valuable minerals to help pay for health care. While Hillman was drilling for minerals he felt an electrical shock go through his drill and into his body. When he checked back with a doctor he was no longer ill. He soon started a resort called the Hillman with a large hotel and smaller buildings around it with areas for the guests to sit on the rocks and dip their feet in the water. A while later in 1901, the hotel burnt down and today very little remains.

The town's municipal charter was dissolved in 1995.
