= Hillman City, Seattle =

Neighborhood in Seattle, Washington, United States

Coordinates: 47°33′04″N 122°16′39″W

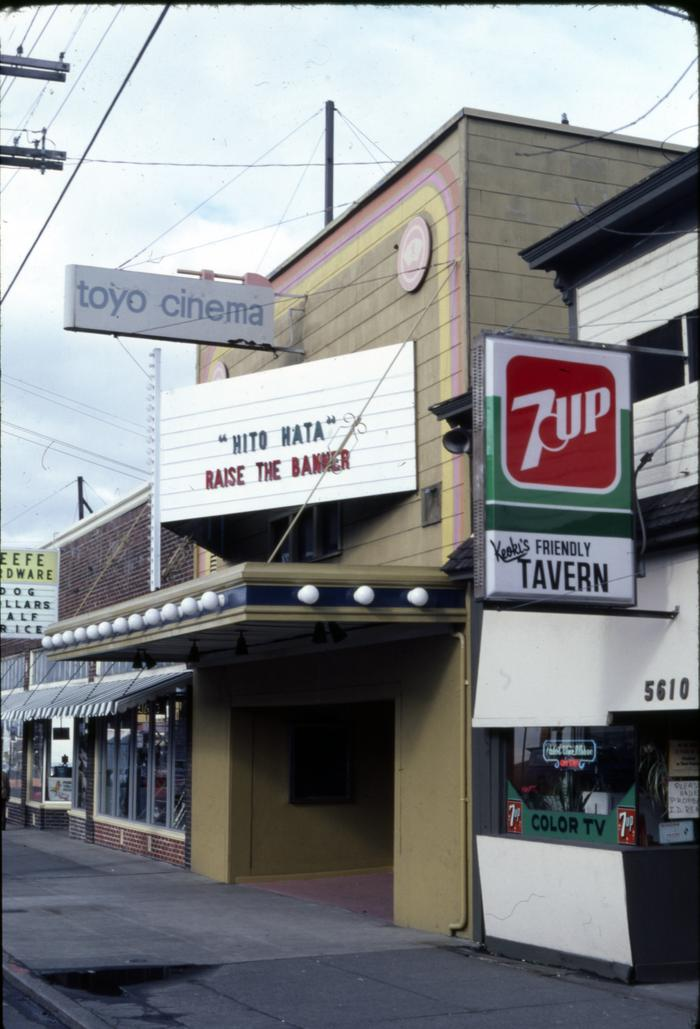
A cinema in Hillman City photographed in 1981

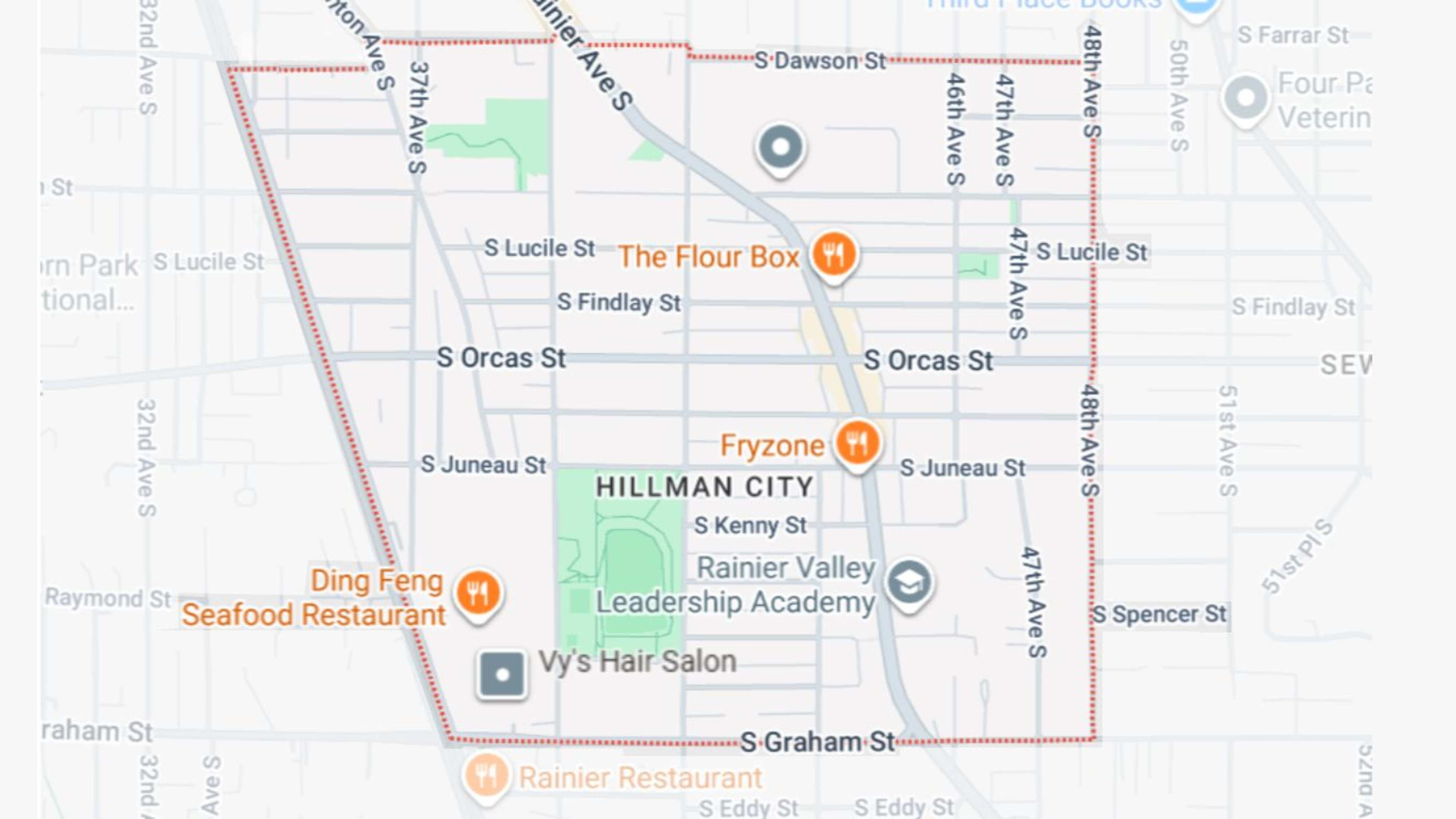
Hillman City borders as of 2026

Hillman City is a primarily residential neighborhood in southeastern Seattle, Washington, located in the Rainier Valley and centered about a half mile south of the Columbia City neighborhood. It was annexed by Seattle in January 1907, along with the rest of the town of Southeast Seattle.

The approximate borders of the neighborhood are South Dawson Street to the north, South Graham Street to the south, Martin Luther King Jr. Way South to the west, and 48th Avenue South to the east.

== History ==
First homesteaded by M.D. Woodin in 1863, Hillman City as a community originated in the 1890s, with a stop on the new Rainier Valley Electric Railway as its nucleus. The neighborhood was named after Clarence Dayton "C.D." Hillman, who platted the area and built himself a house there just off of Rainier. Hillman was a real estate developer, and his business practices ranging into the fraudulent eventually landed him in a federal penitentiary. Hillman City resident Mikala Woodward, director of the Rainier Valley Historical Society, acknowledged at the time of the centennial of the neighborhood's annexation by Seattle, "We were named after a sleazy charlatan." Seattle pioneer Birdsey Wetmore resided in Hillman City until his death in 1909.

While never a serious challenger to Columbia City as the region's main business district, Hillman City did boast a real estate office, grocery, butcher, hardware store, bakery, tile factory, movie theater, and for a time an opera house and a circular fountain at the intersection of Rainier and Orcas. Like most of the Rainier Valley, Hillman City declined after the mid-20th century; in the 1980s its perhaps best-known institution was the former grocery and butcher shop, which had become Hillman City Boxing Gym (the building is, as of 2011, Lee's Martial Arts Academy, offering instruction in karate and taekwondo). In 1999, a Department of Neighborhoods study wrote that "Historic Hillman City... is commonly described by residents as deteriorating and depressed. However, with a near continuous facade of streetfront buildings and a modest pedestrian scale, Hillman City has the opportunity, many believe, to become an attractive neighborhood center."

=== Recent history ===
By 2007, the neighborhood was showing some signs of recovery, though still a mixed picture. The Hillman City Business Association worked to improve the quality of life in the neighborhood, by organizing community events, patrols, and litter cleanups.

In June 2013, a congregation and an arts collective leased a building on the northwest corner of Rainier and Orcas and an adjacent vacant lot, gutted the space, and, several months later, opened the Hillman City Collaboratory, a non-profit community center and co-working space. The Collaboratory closed in 2021.

In August 2013, the Seattle Weekly named Hillman City the "Best Up-and-Coming Neighborhood" in Seattle. Some worry, however, that the neighborhood may lose its identity as it changes.

In 2015, a group called Vision Hillman City held a series of roundtable discussions open to all neighbors and designed to identify neighborhood priorities, create plans for future action, and cultivate a shared neighborhood identity.

Since 2024, an annual block party named "What's Good" (stylized in all caps) has been held in Hillman City. It takes place in August and is organized by the Hillman City Neighborhood Association.
