= Ponsie Barclay Hillman =

American labor and civil rights activist (1918–2008)

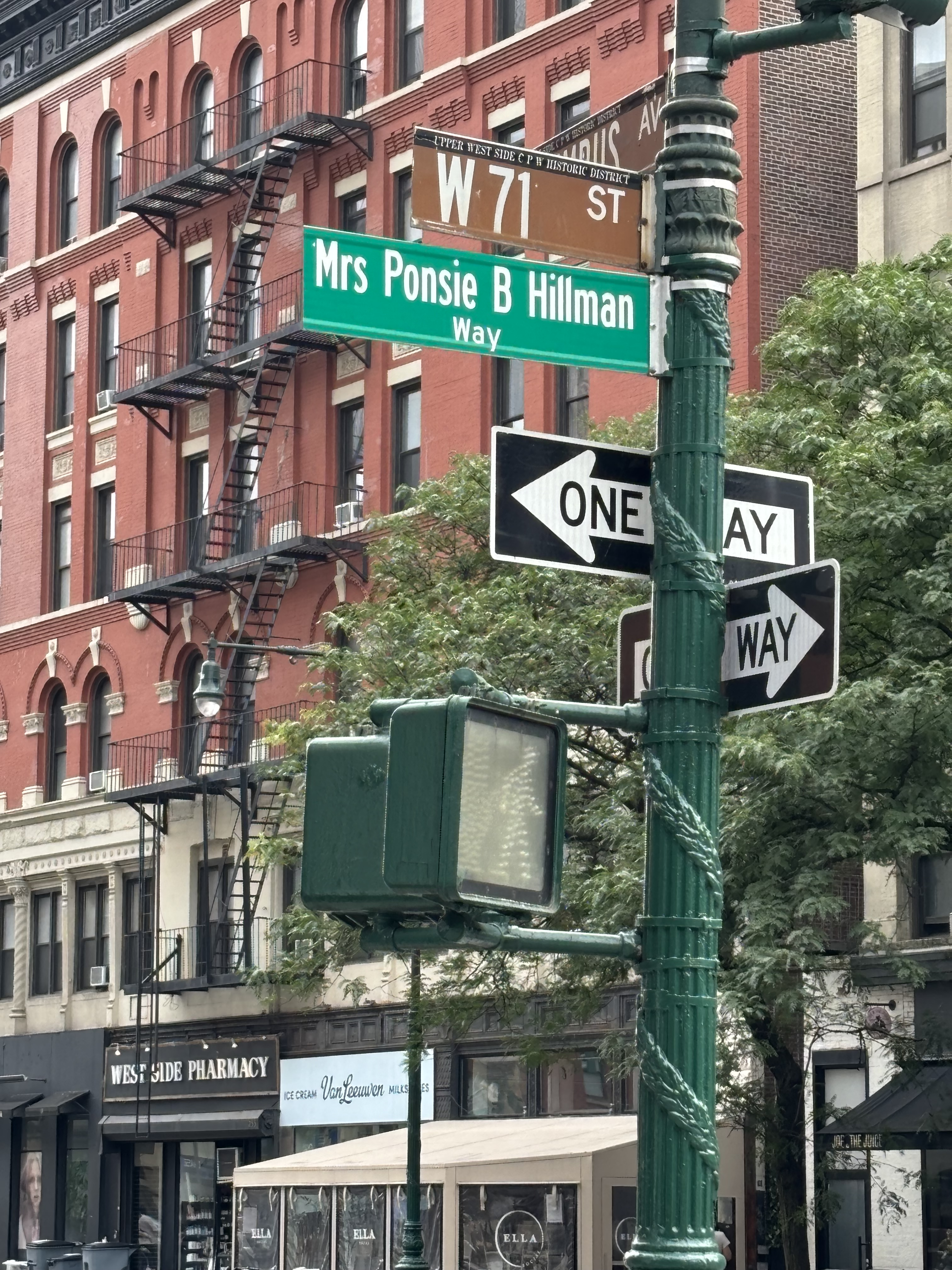
Mrs. Ponsie B. Hillman Way

Ponsie Barclay Hillman (1918–2008) was a pioneer in the civil rights, women's and labor movements. Her life’s mission was to build coalitions to fight the wrongs she saw in society. She was a proud member of numerous community organizations in New York City, her home base for over 45 years. As a lifelong member of the NAACP; continuously working at the Mid-Manhattan and New York branches and on the state and national level, she believed in the advancement of the African-American community. In the summer of 1963, she was one of 53 teachers that led the American Federation of Teachers’ Freedom Schools Project, in Prince Edward County, Virginia to desegregate public schools.

Always a fervent community activist, she also rallied behind the North Manhattan Alumnae chapter of her sorority, Delta Sigma Theta, Inc., and the United Federation of Teachers. Hillman's love for Harlem was evident by her work with the Deltas, a historically black sorority. She established the first Education Committee and served as its chairperson. For many years, on Saturdays, Hillman mentored girls, taking them to view exhibits at the Liberty Science Center and other cultural events in New Jersey and New York City.

In addition to her work as a teacher, college math professor, and assistant treasurer of the United Federation of Teachers, she was also a Wall Street investor.

On September 17, 2017, the northwest corner of Columbus Avenue and West 71st was renamed "Mrs. Ponsie B. Hillman Way". At her street naming, a statement from Barack Obama referring to Hillman was read: "We stand on the shoulders of giants who helped form a more perfect union. Our heritage is forged by men and women who organized, agitated and advocated for change, who fought to build a nation where no one is a second-class citizen and no one is denied basic rights."
