= Eugène Mutimura =

Rwandan scientist and researcher

Eugene Mutimura is a Rwandan scientist and researcher. He is currently the Executive Secretary of the Rwanda's National Council for Science and Technology (NCST). Prior to this appointment, Mutimura served as the minister of education of the Republic of Rwanda. Prior to his appointment as minister of education, Mutimura coordinated the Eastern and Southern African Centers of Excellence project funded by the World Bank in eight countries, to support research and education in sixteen universities. He was a recipient of the Fulbright Scholarship. He obtained his doctoral degree from the University of Witwatersrand, Johannesburg in 2007 and previously worked at the Regional Alliance for Sustainable Development.
