= Cathcart, Washington =

- CDP
- Location of Cathcart in Snohomish County
- Coordinates: 47°51′9″N 122°6′21″W
- Country: United States
- State: Washington
- County: Snohomish

Area
  - Total: 3.9 sq mi (10.0 km^{2})
  - Land: 3.9 sq mi (10.0 km^{2})
  - Water: 0 sq mi (0.0 km^{2})
- Elevation: 226 ft (69 m)

Population (2020)
  - Total: 2,647
  - Density: 686/sq mi (265/km^{2})
- Time zone: UTC-8 (Pacific (PST))
  - Summer (DST): UTC-7 (PDT)
- ZIP Code: 98296
- Area code(s): 360, 564
- FIPS code: 53-10600
- GNIS feature ID: 1512074

Cathcart is a census-designated place (CDP) in Snohomish County, Washington, United States. The population was 2,647 at the 2020 census, up from 2,458 at the 2010 census. Based on per capita income, one of the more reliable measures of affluence, Cathcart ranks 45th of 522 areas in the state of Washington to be ranked. Cathcart was named for Isaac Cathcart, a lumberman, entrepreneur, and Snohomish County pioneer.

== Geography ==
Cathcart is located at 47°51′9″N 122°6′21″W (47.852603, -122.105802). It is located between Snohomish and Woodinville.

According to the United States Census Bureau, the CDP has a total area of 3.9 square miles (10.0 km^{2}), all of it land.

== Demographics ==
Historical population
Census	Pop.	Note	%±
2000	3,015		—
2010	2,458		−18.5%
2020	2,647		7.7%
U.S. Decennial Census; 1970 1980 1990; 2000 2010

Cathcart first appeared as a census designated place in the 2000 U.S. census.

=== Racial and ethnic composition ===
Cathcart CDP, Washington – Racial and ethnic composition Note: the US Census treats Hispanic/Latino as an ethnic category. This table excludes Latinos from the racial categories and assigns them to a separate category. Hispanics/Latinos may be of any race.
Race / Ethnicity (NH = Non-Hispanic)	Pop 2000	Pop 2010	Pop 2020	% 2000	% 2010	% 2020
White alone (NH)	2,810	2,273	2,126	93.20%	92.47%	80.32%
Black or African American alone (NH)	13	7	16	0.43%	0.28%	0.60%
Native American or Alaska Native alone (NH)	12	5	14	0.40%	0.20%	0.53%
Asian alone (NH)	24	34	89	0.80%	1.38%	3.36%
Native Hawaiian or Pacific Islander alone (NH)	1	3	1	0.03%	0.12%	0.04%
Other race alone (NH)	4	1	10	0.13%	0.04%	0.38%
Mixed race or Multiracial (NH)	66	42	182	2.19%	1.71%	6.88%
Hispanic or Latino (any race)	85	93	209	2.82%	3.78%	7.90%
Total	3,015	2,458	2,647	100.00%	100.00%	100.00%

=== 2000 census ===
As of the census of 2000, there were 3,015 people, 1,016 households, and 815 families residing in the CDP. The population density was 724.6 people per square mile (279.8/km^{2}). There were 1,042 housing units at an average density of 250.4/sq mi (96.7/km^{2}). The racial makeup of the CDP was 94.16% White, 0.46% African American, 0.46% Native American, 0.80% Asian, 0.23% Pacific Islander, 1.39% from other races, and 2.49% from two or more races. Hispanic or Latino of any race were 2.82% of the population.

There were 1,016 households, out of which 43.2% had children under the age of 18 living with them, 70.1% were married couples living together, 6.1% had a female householder with no husband present, and 19.7% were non-families. 14.5% of all households were made up of individuals, and 3.0% had someone living alone who was 65 years of age or older. The average household size was 2.96 and the average family size was 3.27.

In the CDP, the age distribution of the population shows 30.2% under the age of 18, 6.5% from 18 to 24, 32.6% from 25 to 44, 24.1% from 45 to 64, and 6.5% who were 65 years of age or older. The median age was 37 years. For every 100 females, there were 102.9 males. For every 100 females age 18 and over, there were 99.7 males.

The median income for a household in the CDP was $65,357, and the median income for a family was $77,552. Males had a median income of $52,425 versus $32,417 for females. The per capita income for the CDP was $28,716. About 1.9% of families and 3.9% of the population were below the poverty line, including 1.1% of those under age 18 and 5.3% of those age 65 or over.
