= OK (The Fall of Troy album) =

Studio album by The Fall of Troy
- Released: April 20, 2016
- Recorded: 2014–2016
- Genres: Post-hardcore; math rock; progressive rock; emo; mathcore
- Length: 33:29
- Label: Self-released
- Producers: The Fall of Troy, Johnny Goss, Charles Macak

The Fall of Troy chronology
In the Unlikely Event (2009)	OK (2016)	Mukiltearth (2020)

Professional ratings
Review scores
Source	Rating
Under The Gun Review	3.5/5 stars
Alt Dialogue	9/10 stars

OK is the fifth studio album by American mathcore band The Fall of Troy, released on April 20, 2016. The album was self-released for free on the band's website. It was the first release since their 2009 album, In the Unlikely Event, and the first since their reunion in 2013. In May of 2016, the band released OK#2, an alternative and more raw mix of OK, which was also released for free. Two further versions, OK#3.1 and OK#3.2, instrumental versions of both OK and OK#2, respectively, were released for free on their website.

== Track-listing ==
No.	Title	Length
1.	"401k"	3:04
2.	"Inside/out"	4:41
3.	"Savior"	3:38
4.	"A single Word"	3:42
5.	"Side by Side"	2:33
6.	"Suck-o-matic"	3:19
7.	"An Ode to the Masochists"	2:38
8.	"Auto-Repeater"	2:50
9.	"Love-sick"	2:12
10.	"Your Loss"	4:52
Total length:		33:29

== Personnel ==
- Thomas Erak: Guitar, vocals, producer
- Tim Ward: Bass, vocals, producer
- Andrew Forsman: Drums, synth, producer
- Lara Hilgemann: Vocals
- Dr. Skankenstein: Synth
- Jake Carden: Synth
- Johnny Goss: Synth, producer, engineering (at Dandelion Gold)
- Charles Macak: Producer, mixing (at Electrowerks)
- Troy Glessner: Mastering (at SPECTRE)
- Wood Simmons: Design and layout
