= The Fall of Troy =

The Fall of Troy may refer to:

- Trojan War
- The Fall of Troy (book), a book written by Quintus Smyrnaeus in the 4th century about the Trojan War
- The Fall of Troy (band), an American post-hardcore band
- The Fall of Troy (album), debut self-titled album by The Fall of Troy
- The Fall of Troy (film), a 1911 Italian film
- The Fall of Troy, the second part of the 1924 German film Helena
