= Phantom on the Horizon =

EP by The Fall of Troy
- Released: November 28, 2008
- Recorded: October 2008
- Genres: Post-hardcore; math rock; progressive rock; mathcore; progressive metal; space rock
- Length: 37:07
- Label: Equal Vision
- Producer: Casey Bates

The Fall of Troy chronology
Manipulator (2007)	Phantom on the Horizon (2008)	In the Unlikely Event (2009)

Alternative cover
- Cover art for the 12" vinyl LP release of Phantom on the Horizon.

Professional ratings
Review scores
Source	Rating
Loudhawk.com	8.4/10 stars
Punknews.org	3/5 stars
SputnikMusic	5/5 stars
AbsolutePunk	86%

Phantom on the Horizon is a concept EP by American rock band The Fall of Troy that was released on November 28, 2008, through Equal Vision Records. It is the completed version of the Ghostship Demos EP that the band released in 2004. This rerecorded version of the original demos features five "chapters" and was produced by Casey Bates (Fear Before, Chiodos, Portugal. The Man).

The concept behind Phantom on the Horizon tells the fictional story of a Spanish galleon meeting with a ghost ship from another dimension.

== Release ==
The Fall of Troy began working on Phantom on the Horizon five years prior to its release in the gap between The Fall of Troy and Doppelgänger. In 2004, demos of some of the tracks that would later be featured on Phantom on the Horizon were leaked onto the internet and dubbed Ghostship Demos EP. The demos were never released in a physical form of media. In October 2008, The Fall of Troy secretly recorded the album and released it the following month on November 28, 2008.

Physical copies of the album were released exclusively through the band on their winter 2008 tour with The Number Twelve Looks Like You, and on The Fall of Troy's web store. Only 3,000 individually numbered copies of the album were made (although physical copies were numbered out of 3,300) – one half were sold on tour and the other half sold through the band's web store. An MP3 digital download version of the album became available on The Fall of Troy's webstore once physical copies sold out.

In January 2009, The Fall of Troy expressed their interest in releasing the album on vinyl "sometime in the near future". The vinyl release of the album was available on April 28, 2009, in limited quantities. There were 1,000 copies made with an orange and white swirl colored vinyl available exclusively through The Fall of Troy's webstore, and 1,000 copies made with a clear colored vinyl available exclusively through Hot Topic. The vinyl record version of the album features different artwork than the CD and download versions. The record was later re-released on vinyl in early 2012 by MerchNow and Equal Vision records.

== Track listing ==
1. "Chapter I: Introverting Dimensions" – 10:51
2. "Chapter II: A Strange Conversation" – 4:42
3. "Chapter III: Nostalgic Mannerisms" – 7:52
4. "Chapter IV: Enter the Black Demon" – 5:36
5. "Chapter V: The Walls Bled Lust" – 8:08

== Personnel ==
The Fall of Troy

- Thomas Erak – vocals, guitar, keys
- Frank Ene – bass, backing vocals
- Andrew Forsman – drums, percussion

Guest musicians

- Dave Marion (of Fear Before) – vocals
- Ryann Donnelly (of Schoolyard Heroes) – vocals
- Jonah Bergman (of Schoolyard Heroes) – vocals
- Nouela Johnston (of Mon Frere) – keyboards
- Katie Mosehauer – violin, string arrangements
- Angela Kimber – cello, string arrangements
- Jay Beaman (formerly of Red Museum) – glockenspiel, tambourine, other auxiliary percussion arrangements

Production and art

- Casey Bates – producer
- Christen Shaw – art direction
- Curtis Tanner – A&R
