= Doppelgänger (The Fall of Troy album) =

Studio album by the Fall of Troy
- Released: August 16, 2005
- Recorded: 2004–2005
- Studio: Sound House in Ballard, WA
- Genres: Post-hardcore; math rock; progressive rock; emo; progressive metal
- Length: 44:33
- Label: Equal Vision
- Producer: Barett Jones

The Fall of Troy chronology
The Fall of Troy (2003)	Doppelgänger (2005)	Manipulator (2007)

Singles from Doppelgänger
- 1. "F.C.P.R.E.M.I.X." Released: May 26, 2006

Professional ratings
Review scores
Source	Rating
AllMusic	3.5/5 stars

Doppelgänger is the second studio album from American mathcore band the Fall of Troy, which followed up the band's bootlegged Ghostship Demos EP from 2004 as well as their self-titled LP from 2003. Four of the songs ("I Just Got This Symphony Goin'", "F.C.P.R.E.M.I.X.", "Mouths Like Sidewinder Missiles", "Whacko Jacko Steals the Elephant Man's Bones") were re-recorded versions of tracks from the self-titled album, hence the name Doppelgänger, while "Macaulay McCulkin" was taken from the Ghostship Demos EP.

Much of this album takes inspiration from Mark Z. Danielewski's 2000 novel House of Leaves, if not lyrically, at least by way of titling tracks. Track 4, "You Got a Death Wish, Johnny Truant?" is a direct quote from the book, stated by Truant's longtime friend Lude as Truant moves to drunkenly accost a man much stronger than himself in a bar. Track 6, The Hol[ ]y Tape... is another direct reference, hailing from p. 333 of the novel. Filling the brackets, this would read 'The Holloway Tape’, though the absence of letters deigning to name holiness in the face of the terror contained within this tape is undoubtedly not lost on the artists nor the author. Finally, track 10, entitled Tom Waits, may be either a reference to the character of Tom Navidson keeping watch while his brother Will and friend Billy Reston descend treacherously into the house on their own, or more simply to the renowned alternative singer/songwriter Tom Waits himself- the lyrics, however, suggest the former.

== Track listing ==
No.	Title	Length
1.	"I Just Got This Symphony Goin'"	4:09
2.	"Act One, Scene One"	5:00
3.	"F.C.P.R.E.M.I.X."	3:57
4.	"'You Got a Death Wish, Johnny Truant?'"	2:12
5.	"Mouths Like Sidewinder Missiles"	3:44
6.	"The Hol[ ]y Tape..."	4:51
7.	"Laces Out, Dan!"	2:31
8.	"We Better Learn to Hotwire a Uterus"	2:10
9.	"Whacko Jacko Steals the Elephant Man's Bones"	4:50
10.	"Tom Waits"	3:03
11.	"Macaulay McCulkin"	8:06
Total length:		44:33

== Personnel ==
- Tim Ward – bass, unclean vocals
- Thomas Erak – guitar, clean vocals, keys
- Andrew Forsman – drums, percussion (credited as "see through drums" in the liners on the original CD release)
- Barett Jones – production, engineering, mixing
- Ed Brooks – mastering
- Kester Limner – artwork
- Andy Myers – layout
- Aya Sato – photography
