= Mukiltearth =

Studio album by The Fall of Troy
- Released: August 7, 2020
- Recorded: 2016–2019
- Genre: Post-hardcore; math rock; progressive rock; mathcore
- Length: 39:22
- Label: Self-released

The Fall of Troy chronology
OK (2016)	Mukiltearth (2020)

Professional ratings
Review scores
Source	Rating
Dead Press!	5/10 stars

Mukiltearth is the sixth studio album by American mathcore band The Fall of Troy, released on August 7, 2020. The album is composed of six songs written while the band members were still in high school, followed by four songs of new material.

== Track listing ==
No.	Title	Length
1.	"A Tribute to Orville Wilcox"	2:12
2.	"Chain Wallet, Nike Shoes"	5:00
3.	"The Tears of Green-Eyed Angels"	4:25
4.	"Mirrors Are More Fun Than Television"	6:08
5.	"The Day the Strength of Men Failed"	4:01
6.	"Knife Fight at the Mormon Church"	4:14
7.	"Counting Sheep"	2:21
8.	"Round House"	4:04
9.	"Borborygmi"	2:52
10.	"We Are the Future"	4:05
Total length:		39:22

== Personnel ==
The Fall of Troy

- Thomas Erak – guitar, bass, vocals
- Tim Ward – bass, vocals
- Andrew Forsman – drums, vocals

Additional

- Johnny Goss – synth, mixing
- Big Tom – vocals
- Abbo – artwork

== External links section ==
- Official site
