= The Fall of Troy (album) =

Studio album by The Fall of Troy
- Released: November 4, 2003
- Recorded: May 2003
- Studios: The Hall of Justice, Seattle, WA
- Genres: Post-hardcore; hardcore punk
- Length: 42:16
- Labels: Lujo; Equal Vision (re-release)
- Producer: Joel M. Brown

The Fall of Troy chronology
The Fall of Troy (2003)	Doppelgänger (2005)

Alternative Cover
- Re-release cover

Professional ratings
Review scores
Source	Rating
Punknews.org	4.5/5 stars

The Fall of Troy is the debut studio album by The Fall of Troy, released on November 4, 2003. It was released by Lujo Records and Equal Vision Records on the re-release. It was recorded at The Hall of Justice in Seattle.

== Track listing ==
All tracks are written by The Fall of Troy.

No.	Title	Length
1.	"Rockstar Nailbomb!"	2:02
2.	"Spartacus"	1:15
3.	"The Circus That Has Brought Us Back to These Nights (Yo Chocola)"	3:08
4.	"Mouths Like Sidewinder Missiles"	3:51
5.	"The Last March of the Ents"	2:59
6.	"F.C.P.S.I.T.S.G.E.P.G.E.P.G.E.P."	4:40
7.	"Whacko Jacko Steals the Elephant Man's Bones"	4:51
8.	"Reassurance Rests in the Sea"	3:58
9.	"The Adventures of Allan Gordon"	4:06
10.	"I Just Got This Symphony Goin'"	4:14
11.	"What Sound Does a Mastodon Make?"	7:12
Total length:		42:16

== Information ==
The whole album was recorded in one week throughout one take.

Lead singer and guitarist Thomas Erak has the original album's cover art tattooed on his left arm.

"The Last March of The Ents" is about the Destruction of Isengard from J.R.R. Tolkien's The Lord of the Rings. "The Adventures of Allan Gordon" is about the book The Iceberg Hermit.

Fans have speculated about the meaning of "F.C.P.S.I.T.S.G.E.P.G.E.P.G.E.P.". According to the band's FAQ, "No comment, and even if you figure it out, it doesn't mean anything.”

== Personnel ==
- Tim Ward – bass, unclean vocals
- Thomas Erak – guitar, clean vocals
- Andrew Forsman – drums
- Joel M. Brown – production, additional vocals on "F.C.P.S.I.T.S.G.E.P.G.E.P.G.E.P."
- Jeff Suffering – vocals on "Spartacus" and "F.C.P.S.I.T.S.G.E.P.G.E.P.G.E.P."
- Gail Erak – vocals on "What Sound Does a Mastodon Make" and backing vocals on "F.C.P.S.I.T.S.G.E.P.G.E.P.G.E.P."
- Andy Myers – design and layout
