= Allan Gordon =

Fictional British whaler

Allan Gordon is the fictional protagonist of James Hogg's novella The Surpassing Adventures of Allan Gordon. According to the narrative, Allan Gordon was the sole survivor of the Anne Forbes, a whaling ship that disappeared without a trace in 1757. According to a modern editor of Hogg's work, the character of Allan Gordon was inspired by Robinson Crusoe and Hogg's interest, at the time, in polar exploration. Sarah Moss also identifies Mungo Park's Travels in the Interior of Africa, accounts of the Ross and Parry expeditions, William Scoresby's Account of the Arctic Regions and The Rime of the Ancient Mariner as inspirational sources for the narrative.

== Fictional history ==
The Surpassing Adventures of Allan Gordon by James Hogg reportedly preserved the autobiographical accounts of Allan Gordon to schoolmaster John Duff. According to Gillian Hughes, "Hogg originally wrote after this 'having been sent to me as a curiosity by the Earl of Fife to whom I have to express my grateful acknowledgement', and then changed the latter part of this to 'the late ingenious Duchess of Gordon in a quarto vol. among many other curious relics copied for her Grace by a clever amanuensis. I expressed my acknowledgements to her long ago and now thus publicly acknowledge it once again' ". According to the accounts, Allan was the son of Adam Gordon, a farm worker. Allan was born in "a small cottage three miles above" Huntly, Scotland. Adam Gordon taught his son to read but not write. He then arranged for his son an apprenticeship to a tailor of Huntly, starting c. 1751.

The tailor was reportedly a "little crooked wretch" who repeatedly took out his anger on his apprentice in the form of physical and psychological abuse. After nearly a year of maltreatment, Allan refused to take another beating. Subsequent arguments amongst the pair escalated into physical fighting and, on one particular day of violence, Allan left his employer unconscious on the ground. On that same day the 12-year-old Allan left Huntly for Aberdeen.

Allan first found employment as a cabin boy and later as a sailor, which remained his occupation for the following five years. By this time Allan had reportedly become attached to the "nautical life" and enjoyed visiting new cities with every voyage. He joined the crew of the Anne Forbes for the first time in 1757. John Hughes, captain of the Anne Forbes, was described by Allan as a "drunken rash headlong fool" of an Englishman.

== Sole survivor ==
Allan was only 17 years old when the Anne Forbes hit an iceberg in the Arctic fog somewhere off the coast of Greenland. According to the story Allan told when he returned to Aberdeen in 1764, he was thrown from his lookout point onto the iceberg by the force of the collision.

The Anne Forbes, soon after apparently sinking, resurfaced (presumably due to air trapped in the holds of the ship) and was eventually forced onto an underwater ledge of the iceberg where it quickly froze in place. Allan lived for some time in the imprisoned ship before finally escaping. This is remarkably similar to the events that transpired in September 1854 when noted explorer Captain Elisha Kane's ship, the USS Advance, sank in the Arctic seas.

== In other media ==
Allan Gordon was the main character of Arthur J. Roth's book The Iceberg Hermit.

The Adventures of Allan Gordon is the name of a song by The Fall of Troy. On their Live at the Paradox EP (when they were called The Thirty Years' War) guitarist Thomas Erak made reference to 'The Iceberg Hermit' before playing the song.
