= Manipulator (The Fall of Troy album) =

Studio album by The Fall of Troy
- Released: May 1, 2007
- Recorded: December 2006 – January 2007
- Studios: Robert Lang (Shoreline, Washington); Red Room Studio; Avast! Classic (Seattle, Washington)
- Genres: Post-hardcore; math rock; progressive rock; emo; mathcore; sass
- Length: 47:22
- Label: Equal Vision
- Producer: Matt Bayles

The Fall of Troy chronology
Doppelgänger (2005)	Manipulator (2007)	Phantom on the Horizon (2008)

Professional ratings
Review scores
Source	Rating
AbsolutePunk.net	81%
AllMusic	3.5/5 stars
Kerrang!	4/5 stars
Alternative Press	4.5/5 stars
MammothPress.com	(9/10)

Manipulator is the third studio album from mathcore band The Fall of Troy, from Mukilteo, Washington. It was recorded at Robert Lang Studios, Red Room Studios, and Avast Classic, in Seattle, Washington. It was released on May 1, 2007 through Equal Vision Records, and is the follow-up to their previous 2005 effort, Doppelgänger. The title of the album is taken from the song "Sledgehammer".

== Information ==
The album was written in 2006 during what was to vocalist/guitarist Thomas Erak "a really dark time" in his life. Erak states: "We wanted to expand upon our band in every direction musically and attitude-wise", resulting in a much more eclectic album; one that "always keeps listeners guessing." The band also wanted to pursue some of their more pop and pop-rock influences. Drummer Andrew Forsman described the record as

"...a mix of staying true to our punk rock roots whilst pushing new musical ground. We definitely wanted a more poppy sound; we love good pop and we wanted to explore what we could do with that kind of sound. Other than that we wanted to make the songs flow a little better; instead of riff after riff after riff we wanted something that would be more cohesive regardless of the specific style."

Erak adds "Weezer, Saves The Day and The Get Up Kids were all great bands. I am not afraid to venture into that world as long as the creativity and the art is still preserved as part of it." Some noticeable changes from their previous works include the increased amount of non-screamed vocals on the album, and the inclusion of "Caught Up", a song consisting of just Erak singing and playing guitar, with no accompaniment from drummer Andrew Forsman or bass player Tim Ward.

While the album was being recorded, Erak stated that Nouela Johnston of the Seattle band Mon Frere was playing keyboards and adding backing vocals to several of the songs on the album. However upon release of the album, a misprint in the booklet listed Erak as having played keyboards. Erak later apologized on the band's forums for this misprint and asked fans to spread the word online that Johnston played all keyboard parts on the album.

With the members being of the ages of 21, they came to the table with a lot more ideas with this album, and it was stated as being their first "mature" effort. At first, many fans were put off from the different direction of the album in terms of style and instrumentation. A majority of the songs also contained less emphasis on the alternating vocals of Erak and Ward, previously displayed in their last two albums.

The band has stated that "Semi-Fiction" is a renamed version of the previously unreleased song "Ghostship VI" from their Ghostship EP. Just after two minutes into "Semi-Fiction," the guitar part is almost identical to the opening of "Ghostship II" from the same EP.

This was the last album to contain bassist/vocalist Tim Ward before his departure in November 2007.

The track name "A Man a Plan a Canal Panama" is a palindrome, as it is spelled the same forward as backward. It is a reference to former US president Theodore Roosevelt and his role in the construction of the Panama Canal.

The album art was designed and illustrated by bassist Tim Ward.

== Track listing ==
No.	Title	Length
1.	"Cut Down All the Trees and Name the Streets After Them"	2:37
2.	"The Dark Trail"	4:30
3.	"Quarter Past"	4:51
4.	"Problem!?"	1:56
5.	"Semi-Fiction"	4:26
6.	"Oh, The Casino!"	2:17
7.	"Sledgehammer"	6:01
8.	"Seattlantis"	4:01
9.	"Ex-Creations"	3:09
10.	"Shhh!!! If You're Quiet, I'll Show You a Dinosaur"	2:44
11.	"Caught Up"	2:30
12.	"A Man. A Plan. A Canal. Panama."	8:20
Total length:		47:22

Bonus disc: Live at the Boardwalk (Orangevale, CA)
No.	Title	Length
1.	"I Just Got This Symphony Goin'"	5:32
2.	"Ex-Creations"	3:22
3.	"Cut Down All the Trees and Name the Streets After Them"	2:56
4.	"Shhh!!! If You're Quiet, I'll Show You a Dinosaur"	3:00

*This is the actual running order of the CD, the track list printed on the disc itself is incorrect due to an error and has the first and third song switched.

== Personnel ==
- Thomas Erak – vocals, guitar
- Tim Ward – bass guitar, vocals, layout concept and illustrations
- Andrew Forsman – drums

Additional personnel

- Nouela Johnston – keyboards, backing vocals
- Matt Bayles – producer, engineer, mixing
- John Ziemski – assistant at Robert Lang studios
- Ed Brooks – mastering
- Bill Scoville – layout construction
- Brandon Proff – layout construction

== Charts ==
Album - Billboard (North America)

Date	Chart	Position
May 19, 2007	US Billboard 200	76

== Vinyl release ==
In November 2011, Enjoy The Ride Records reissued Manipulator on vinyl for the first time as a double-LP. Only 1,000 copies were pressed with 500 featuring a blue, pink, and orange split on LP1 and a black, white, and gray split on LP2 exclusive to Enjoy The Ride Records & Equal Vision Records website. The other 500 sold exclusively at Hot Topic featuring the same colors in a spiral swirl.
