= This Is Animal Music =

Studio album by Look Mexico
- Released: July 10, 2007
- Recorded: 2006, Tallahassee, FL
- Genre: Emo, indie rock, alternative rock
- Length: 41:48
- Label: Lujo Records lujo052

Look Mexico chronology
The Crucial EP (2006)	This Is Animal Music (2007)	The Crucial Collection (2008)

Professional ratings
Review scores
Source	Rating
Alternative Press	4/5 stars

This Is Animal Music is the debut studio album by Look Mexico. The album, which was released July 10, 2007, has been noted by the band's record label as a mature step forward. The band has toured extensively throughout the US in support of the record. The album can easily be noted as a beginning for the band's commercial success, as it has sparked attention among major music news sources and has even got the band featured in Alternative Press as a band to look for in 2007. The album features guest vocals by Eric Collins of The Dark Romantics (tracks 3, 4, 7) and Nathan Bond of Band Marino (track 7).

== Track listing ==
1. "You Come into My House, While I Sleep?" - 3:17
2. "It's Been a Long Time Since I Smelled Beautiful" - 2:52
3. "I Promise We'll Swing for the Fences" - 3:14
4. "I Had a Wrench, and I Hit Him" - 3:00
5. "Watch Out for This" - 2:40
6. "Dude, You Have a Bazooka" - 2:35
7. "You Ever Get Punched in the Face for Talking Too Much?" - 2:37
8. "Me and My Dad Built Her" - 3:39
9. "I Mean Pushups!" - 1:26
10. "Not On My Watch" - 2:47
11. "Done and Done." - 3:02
12. "Comin' in Hot with a Side of Bacon" - 4:16
13. "Half That Money Is Mine, and I Want It" - 2:02
14. "I Like Being A Millionaire. You Will Too, Believe Me." - 4:07
