= In the Unlikely Event =

Studio album by The Fall of Troy
- Released: October 6, 2009
- Genres: Post-hardcore; math rock; progressive rock; mathcore
- Length: 52:46
- Label: Equal Vision
- Producer: Terry Date

The Fall of Troy chronology
Phantom on the Horizon (2008)	In the Unlikely Event (2009)	OK (2016)

Professional ratings
Review scores
Source	Rating
AllMusic	3.5/5 stars
PopMatters	6/10 stars
Sputnikmusic	2/5 stars

In the Unlikely Event is the fourth studio album by American mathcore band The Fall of Troy, that was released on October 6, 2009. The album was recorded with producer Terry Date and is the only full-length album to feature bassist Frank Ene (first featured on Phantom on the Horizon). It was recorded at Studio Lithio. The album featured a slightly less aggressive style compared to the band's earlier work, in turn facing mixed critical reception.

In the Unlikely Event is available in a deluxe or regular version. According to thefalloftroy.com, "Deluxe version limited to 1,000 copies includes alternate packaging and a USB drive featuring videos, band commentary, and more."

Copies of the album sold came with a sticker attached advertising the Fall of Troy Track Pack, a trio of songs from the album available as downloadable content for music video game Guitar Hero 5. These songs ("Panic Attack!", "A Classic Case of Transference" and "Single") were made available on December 3, 2009.

== Track listing ==
In the Unlikely Event contains 12 tracks,

1. "Panic Attack!" – 3:34
2. "Straight-Jacket Keelhauled" – 2:24
3. "Battleship Graveyard" – 5:10
4. "A Classic Case of Transference" – 4:43
5. "Single" – 3:06
6. "Empty the Clip, the King Has Been Slain, Long Live the Queen" – 3:17
7. "People and Their Lives" – 6:18
8. "Dirty Pillow Talk" 4:18
9. "Nobody's Perfect" – 4:44
10. "Webs" – 4:18
11. "Walk of Fame" – 5:20
12. "Nature vs. Nurture" – 5:43

=== "Deluxe Edition" USB bonus ===
1. "The Vomiting Winter" (Demo) – 4:20

== Personnel ==
=== The Fall of Troy ===
- Thomas Erak – Vocals, guitar, keys, drums on "Webs"
- Frank Ene – Bass, backing vocals
- Andrew Forsman – Drums, percussion, background vocals

=== Additional personnel ===
- Ryann Donnelly (Schoolyard Heroes) – Guest vocals on "Panic Attack!", "Dirty Pillow Talk", "Nobody's Perfect" and "Nature vs. Nurture"
- Rody Walker (Protest the Hero) – Guest vocals on "Dirty Pillow Talk"
- Tim Ward – Artwork
