= Mt. St. Helens Vietnam Band =

Musical band from Seattle, United States

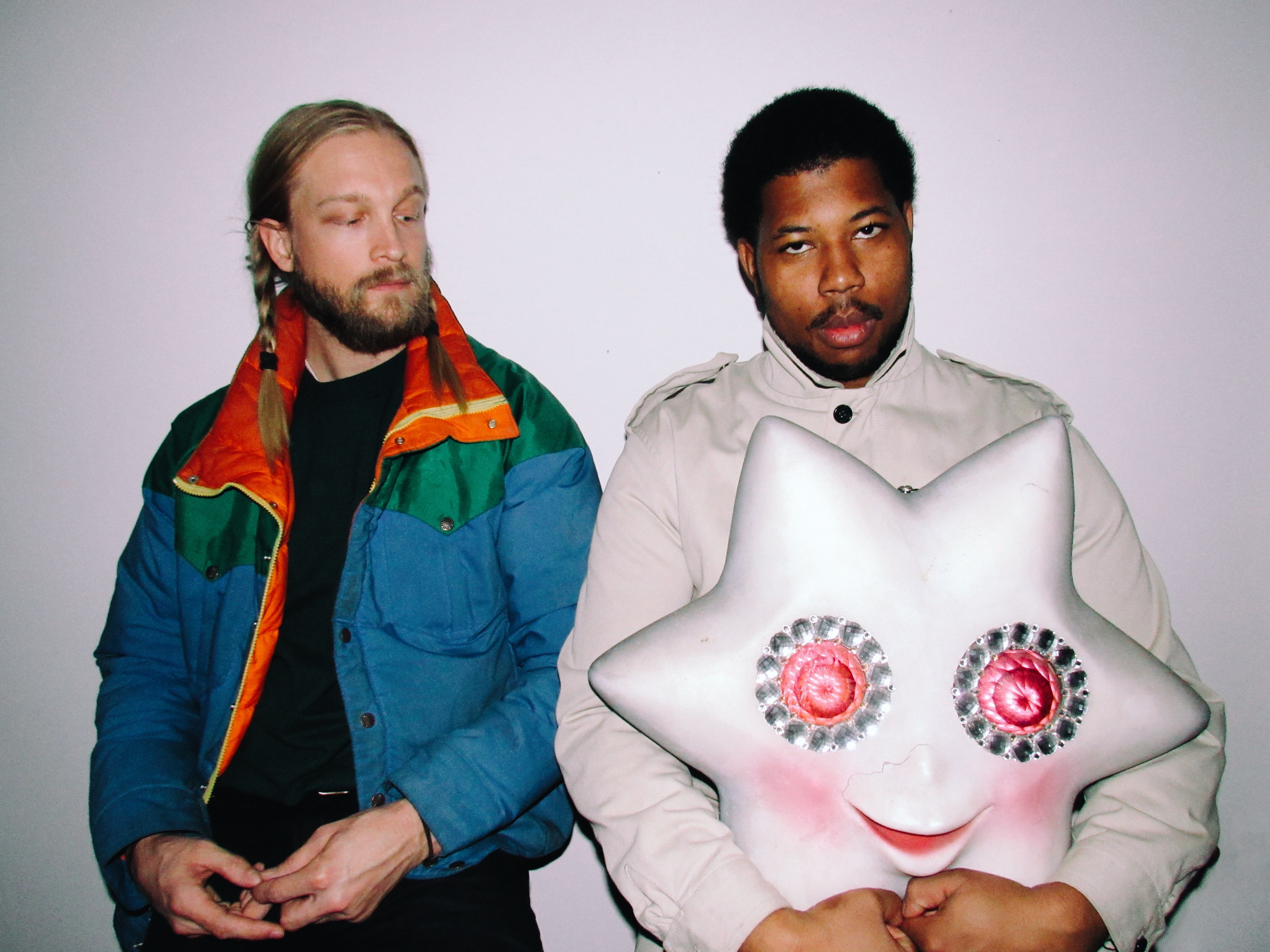
- Benjamin and Marshall Verdoes from Mt. St. Helens Vietnam Band

Background information
- Origin: Seattle, United States
- Genres: Indie rock Alternative Rock
- Years active: 2008–present
- Labels: Dead Oceans; Jenny Invert Records
- Members: Benjamin Verdoes; Marshall Verdoes; Peter Verdoes; Jared Price
- Past members: Matthew Dammer; Traci Eggleston; Drew Fitchette
- Website: Mt. St. Helens Vietnam Band

Mt. St. Helens Vietnam Band is a band from Seattle, United States, that features Benjamin Verdoes as lead vocalist and guitarist, Peter Verdoes on second guitar, Marshall Verdoes as the drummer, and Jared Price on bass. They were signed with Dead Oceans, and released two albums and two EPs between 2008 and 2011 before going on an extended hiatus.

== Formation ==
While Benjamin Verdoes, Peter Verdoes, Matthew Dammer and Jared Price had previously performed as part of the locally successful Lujo Records band In Praise of Folly, Traci Eggleston and Marshall Verdoes were new to the stage. They gained notability through local advertising and comical PSA videos on MySpace and YouTube featuring band members before making any of their music public.

== Beginnings ==
Their official debut appearance was July 31, 2008 at Seattle's Neumos, where their self released EP Weepy was available for the first time. Mt. St. Helens Vietnam Band signed with Dead Oceans in the fall of 2008 and released their self-entitled first LP in the spring of 2009.

== Hiatus ==
In 2011, Benjamin Verdoes put the band on hiatus to focus on his newly formed duo Iska Dhaaf with Nathan Quiroga.

== Reunion ==
In 2021, the band began quietly recording and releasing music and animated film clips to subscribers on Patreon.

On June 20, 2022, the band announced their first show in nine years, playing at Neumos in Seattle on July 31. This date would coincide with the 14th anniversary of the band's debut at the same venue.

Mt. St. Helens Vietnam Band released their first commercially available single since their reformation, "Eyes Wide Shut" on July 20, 2022, through Jenny Invert Records.

== Discography ==
- Weepy EP – 2008 (self-released)
- Mt. St. Helens Vietnam Band LP – 2009 (Dead Oceans)
- Where the Messengers Meet LP – 2010 (Dead Oceans)
- Prehistory EP – 2012 (Dead Oceans)
- Eyes Wide Shut Single – 2022 (Jenny Invert Records)
- February Single – 2024 (Jenny Invert Records)
