= Real Detective (TV series) =

Canadian television series

- Genre: Police detective crime docudrama anthology series
- Written by: Scott Bailey; Tim Doiron; Petro Duszara; Alain Zaloum; Eric Sabbag; Mark Bacci; John McFetridge; Thomas Michael; Gabriel Pelletier
- Directed by: Petro Duszara; Gabriel Pelletier; Robin Aubert; David Hackl; April Mullen; John L'Ecuyer; Martin Villeneuve; Mark Bacci; Michel Poulette
- Country of origin: Canada
- Original language: English
- No. of seasons: 2
- No. of episodes: 16

Production
- Running time: 41–43 minutes
- Production company: WAM

Original release
- Network: Netflix
- Release: 27 September 2016 – 20 April 2017

Real Detective is a Canadian-produced police docudrama (2016–2017) broadcast by Netflix. The anthology series tells a different American true crime murder each episode, through the detective(s) that worked the particular case in a documentary style, alongside a dramatic re-enactment of the events.

Following a single season on Netflix, the show continued as a CBC Television series titled The Detectives.

== Production ==
Each episode follows a American case in a documentary style, though the dramatic reenactment was filmed in Laval, Québec, Canada.

The show had the highest production budget for a true crime show, at just under $4 million.

== Episodes ==
Season	Episodes	Originally released	
Season	Episodes	First released	Last released
1	8	January 7, 2016	February 25, 2016
2	8	March 2, 2017	April 20, 2017

=== Season 1 (2016) ===
No. overall	No. in season	Title
1	1	"Vengeance"
Veteran Seattle detective Mike Ciesynski catches a break in a gut-wrenching case, but the tipster's information has diabolical implications.
2	2	"Malice"
When he goes on the hunt for a serial killer who targets children, Portland, Oregon, detective C.W. Jensen feels his own life starting to crack up.
3	3	"Darkness"
When a murder investigation stalls in Davenport, Florida, detective Tommy Ray gets personally involved with the victim's family until the case takes a surprising turn.
4	4	"Damage"
Texas Ranger Phil Ryan looks into the grim murder of a young woman, but powerful friends of the main suspects interfere with his investigations.
5	5	"Silence"
As murders spike in Hollywood, the case of a young woman stabbed to death becomes personal for hardened Los Angeles homicide detective Don Tabak.
6	6	"Redemption"
Hotshot Marietta, Georgia detective Eddie Herman looks into a double homicide, but the cop's arrogance turns out to be the killer's best ally.
7	7	"Retribution"
Investigating the slaying of a religious man, Louisville, Kentucky homicide detective Leigh Maroni must reveal dark secrets to the victim's anguished mother.
8	8	"Misery"
Rookie Montana cop John Cameron faces personal crisis when the investigation into a missing boy puts him on the path of a twisted serial pedophile.

=== Season 2 (2017) ===
No. overall	No. in season	Title
9	1	"No Remorse"
Special Agent Jeff Rinek had some of the FBI's worst cases assigned to him, but none was as haunting as the kidnapping of a 7-month-old baby from his Sacramento, California home.
10	2	"The Riverside Killer"
A Riverside, California serial killer taunts the cop's lead investigator Bob Creed, whose team traces every bit of forensic evidence to catch the culprit: William Suff.
11	3	"No One Is Safe"
A witness's fears prove challenging for Indianapolis detective Christine Mannina who needs her to come forward to close an execution-style murder case.
12	4	"Every Rose Has a Thorn"
After a reliable guy vanishes from Wausau, Wisconsin, a missing rifle raises suspicions about his girlfriend, who displays feelings for investigator Larry Woebbeking.
13	5	"Blood Brothers"
Long-time partners and friends, inspectors John Conaty and Ray Giacomelli faces a murder case in Pittsburg, California where the prime suspect is a dangerous killer they put behind bars years earlier.
14	6	"Lambs to the Slaughter"
When Florida investigator Rocky Harris is called to the case of the rape-murder of a young girl, he uncovers bad police work and -- finally -- the real killer James Aren Duckett.
15	7	"Angel Doe"
Houston detective Clarence Douglas breaks down recounting his most horrific case, identifying an abandoned, brutally murdered little girl and discovering her killer.
16	8	"Puppet Master"
Detective Steve Ainsworth overseeing the case of a missing young woman later found decapitated near Longmont, Colorado. He finds a connection between her and the leader of a cult-like church.

== Awards and nominations ==
Real Detective has been nominated for five awards and won one.

Year	Award	Category	Nominee(s)	Result	Ref.	Details
2017	ACTRA Montreal Awards	Outstanding Performance - Female	Sabrina Campilii	Nominated		-
2017	Canadian Screen Award	Best Writing in a Factual Program or Series	Tim Doiron	Nominated		Episode: 'Malice'
2017	Canadian Screen Award	Best Photography in a Documentary Program or Series	Barry Russell (Director of Photography)	Nominated		Episode: 'Darkness'
2017	Joey Award	Best Principal or Guest Starring Actor in a TV Series 7-10 Years	Jaeda LeBlanc	Won		-
2018	Canadian Screen Award	Best Sound, Non-Fiction	Jeremy Reid (Re-recording Mixer) Sébastien Bédard (Sound Designer)	Nominated		-
2018	Canadian Screen Award	Best Picture Editing, Factual	Fannie Daoust Glenn Berman	Nominated		Episode: 'Blood Brothers'
