= William Suff =

American serial killer on death row

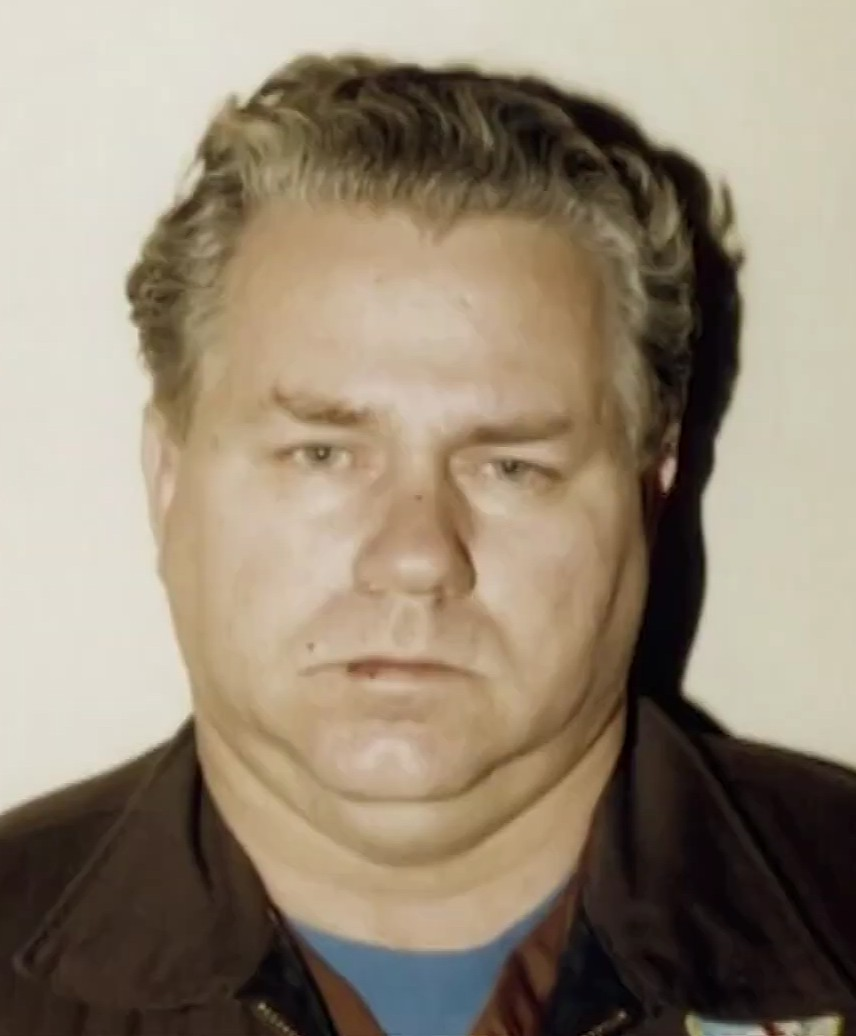
- Suff in a 1992 mugshot
- Born: Bill Lee Suff; August 20, 1950 (age 76); Torrance, California, U.S.
- Other names: The Riverside Prostitute Killer; The Lake Elsinore Killer
- Convictions: Texas: Murder (1 count); California: First-degree murder with special circumstances (12 counts); Attempted murder (1 count)
- Penalty: Death penalty (de jure)

Details
- Victims: 14 known victims, suspected of 7 more
- Span of crimes: 1973; 1986 – 1991
- Country: United States
- States: Texas, California
- Date apprehended: January 9, 1992

William Lester Suff (born Bill Lee Suff; August 20, 1950) is an American serial killer who tortured and killed at least thirteen women in Riverside County, California, from 1986 to 1991, earning nicknames such as the Riverside Prostitute Killer and the Lake Elsinore Killer, as some of his victims were dumped in Lake Elsinore. Years earlier, in 1973, he murdered his two-month-old daughter in Texas, a crime for which he had only served ten years of a seventy-year sentence.

== Biography ==
Suff's parents had five children, of which he was the eldest. As a child, Suff proved gifted at playing music. Although not popular, Suff made friends easily. Suff's mother was very domineering and had a strong influence over her husband. This is how Suff learned that he could get what he wanted by coercing others.

In 1960, at the age of 10, his parents separated after accusing each other of infidelity. Suff's mother became a prostitute, thus giving Suff a distaste for prostitution. Soon, Suff's mother got back together with another man. This man turned out to be very strict and very unhealthy towards children.

In 1968, at the age of 18, Suff met Teryl, 15, in a marching band, while he was playing. The couple dated before marrying in 1969. Suff soon became verbally abusive to Teryl, threatening to kill her if she did not do what he wanted. She gave birth to his son, William Lester Suff Jr., in November 1970. A daughter, Dijiania, was born in July 1973. Suff was physically abusive to his daughter.

== First murder ==
On September 25, 1973, Teryl was forced to leave the family home and entrusted Suff with the care of their daughter. The custody arrangement went awry, and Suff hit her two-month-old daughter. Noticing that she was no longer breathing, Suff called Teryl to report the problem. Teryl rushed to the marital home and found her unconscious. Emergency services confirmed the child's death. An autopsy showed that the first abuse against the child had occurred at birth. Suff and Teryl were charged with mistreatment resulting in death and remanded in custody.

In 1974, a Texas jury convicted Suff and his then-wife, Teryl, of beating their two-month-old daughter to death. The Texas Court of Criminal Appeals later reversed Teryl's conviction but upheld Suff's in Suff v. State (Tex. 1976) 531 S.W.2d 814, finding insufficient evidence to convict her as either the primary actor or a principal in their baby's murder. Teryl claimed that Suff was physically abusive to her during their marriage.

Though Suff was sentenced to 70 years in a Texas prison, he served only ten years before his release on parole on March 6, 1984.

== Later murders ==
Suff was convicted of twelve counts of murder and one count of attempted murder.

Rhonda Jetmore

On January 10, 1989, Rhonda Jetmore, 27, a sex worker, entered into a sexual transaction with Suff. The agreement turned violent when he began choking her. She struck him with a flashlight she had in her hand, causing Suff to lose his grip, allowing her to briefly escape. Suff tackled her to the ground and began ripping off her clothes. He stuck his finger in her mouth and she bit down, causing one of her teeth to break. Suff pulled back and Jetmore was able to run to the door, but he tackled her again. As she pleaded with Suff to let her go, he lost track of his glasses. She used her flashlight to shine a light on them and when Suff went to pick them up, she ran out the door and flagged down a car. The passenger, whom she happened to know, pulled out a gun and fired at Suff, and she was able to escape.

Kimberly Lyttle

On June 28, 1989, Kimberly Lyttle, 28, was found manually strangled to death on the side of the road in Lake Elsinore. Her autopsy revealed that she had been hit in the head, and she had cigarette burns on her arms and other areas of her body; all injuries occurring prior to her death. She was covered with a blue bath towel, which was found to have red, white, and blue fibers that were matched to a sleeping bag in Suff's van.

Christina Leal

On December 13, 1989, the body of Christina Leal, 23, was found strangled and stabbed to death on a Quail Valley hillside; she was last seen the night before. Her autopsy revealed marks around her wrists and ankles, indicating she was bound, scratch marks on her face, a black eye, four stab wounds in the middle of her chest, at least two knife wounds on her genitalia, and one of her nipples was partially removed; all antemortem. A lightbulb had been inserted into her vagina and was recovered intact.

Darla Jane Ferguson

On January 18, 1990, Darla Ferguson, 23, was found strangled in Riverside, just half a mile from the body of Kimberly Lyttle. She was found with her legs propped up and a trash bag pulled over the top half of her body, tied at the waist with a rope. Her wrists had been bound and she suffered blunt force trauma before death.

Carol Lynn Miller

On February 9, 1990, Carol Miller, 35, was found nude, with the exception of a shirt pulled over her head, in a grapefruit orchard in Highgrove. The frenulum connecting her upper lip to her gums was torn, indicating she was struggling while being smothered. She had no trauma to her neck. She was stabbed 5 times prior to death. Next to her body was a peeled and eaten grapefruit.

Cheryl Coker

On November 6, 1990, the body of Cheryl Coker, 33, was found in Riverside, partially inside a dumpster. She was found strangled to death, possibly with a wire, with such great force it cut the skin of her neck. Her right breast had been severed post-mortem and was found on a dirt road 30 feet away. A shoe print matching the size, shape, pattern, and wear of shoes belonging to Suff were found at the scene.

Susan Melissa Sternfeld

On December 21, 1990, Susan Sternfeld, 27, was found strangled, nude, and intentionally posed, near a dumpster in Riverside.

Kathleen Leslie Milne

On January 19, 1991, the body of Kathleen Milne, also known as Kathy Puckett, 42, was found nude, lying on a red robe, near a pile of trash, north of Lake Elsinore. A white sock had been stuffed in the back of her throat. Her death was ruled asphyxiation due to the combination of strangulation and the sock blocking her airway.

Sherry Ann Latham

On July 4, 1991, Sherry Latham, 37, was found nude, face down, in Lake Elsinore. Her cause of death was determined to be strangulation, but due to decomposition, no determination could be made on the method.

Kelly Marie Hammond

On August 16, 1991, Kelly Hammond, 27, of Rubidoux, was found strangled in an alley in Corona. Her nude body appeared to be posed; her right arm was bent and tucked under her abdomen, her left arm was bent with her hand on the ground and palm facing upward, her left leg was drawn to her chest, and her right leg was extended outward. She had two lacerations, which occurred prior to death, on her forehead. Her autopsy revealed her death to be caused by strangulation, with acute opiate intoxication a possible contributing factor.

Catherine McDonald

On September 13, 1991, Catherine McDonald, 30, the only black victim attributed to Suff, was found in Lake Elsinore. Her body was also posed; her legs were spread apart but her feet were together, her arms outstretched to the top of her head. She was four months pregnant. Before she died, she was stabbed in the chest three times. She also had a gaping cut on the left side of her neck. Her right breast was removed post-mortem, and she suffered a stab wound, as well as other lacerations, to her genitals, some before and some after death. Her official cause of death was multiple stab wounds to the neck as well as compression. Shoe prints of the same pattern as the other murders were also near McDonald's body.

Delliah Zamora

On October 30, 1991, the body of Delliah Zamora, 35, was found strangled in Glen Avon. She had fingernail injuries consistent with clawing at a ligature, though method was unable to be determined. Her larynx was crushed and broken down the middle, which would require an extreme amount of pressure.

Eleanor Casares

On December 23, 1991, Eleanor Casares, 39, was found in an orange grove near the intersection of Jefferson Street and Victoria Avenue in Riverside. She was stabbed in the chest and strangled. Her breast was removed post-mortem.

=== Suspected murders ===
A number of additional murders were attributed to Suff, though he was never charged, with the exception of Cherie Payseur:

Michelle Yvette Gutierrez

On October 29, 1986, Michelle Gutierrez, 26, was found in a drainage ditch in the Riverside area.

Charlotte Jean Palmer

On December 10, 1986, Charlotte Palmer, 25, was found near Romoland. Though cause of death could not be determined, authorities believe she was smothered.

Linda Ann Ortega

On April 29, 1988, Linda Ortega, 37, was found nude and stabbed to death near the rodeo grounds in Lake Elsinore.

Martha Bess Young

On May 2, 1988, the nude body of Martha Young, 27, of Albuquerque, was found just a few miles away from Linda Ortega. Her cause of death was determined to be a combination of strangulation and overdose of amphetamines. She was previously reported missing, first by her boyfriend, Joseph Shiflitt, who called her mother on April 10, 1988, and then officially by her mother, 17 days later.

Diane Mae Talavera

On January 17, 1989, Diana Talavera, 37, was found strangled on the beach in Lake Elsinore.

Judy "Julie" Lynn Angel

On November 11, 1989, the body of Judy Angel, 36, was found bludgeoned to death in Alberhill, on a street her mother drove every day for work.

Cherie Michelle Payseur

On April 27, 1991, Cherie Payseur, 24, was found on a flower bed behind a bowling alley in Riverside. She was initially found nude, but a patron covered the body with a jean jacket before police arrived. She had been hit in the face, and though no official cause of death could be determined, she was thought to have been suffocated. A number of shoe prints were left at the scene, including a partial shoe print on the small of Payseur's back. The analyzed shoe impressions were thought to be the same as the prints from the scene of Cheryl Coker's murder. The semen collected from Payseur's body revealed two donors, rendering the results inconclusive. The most intensive bands, however, matched Suff, so he could not be excluded as a donor. Suff was charged with Payseur's murder, but the jury was deadlocked, and he was not convicted.

== Arrest ==
Suff subsequently raped, tortured, stabbed, strangled, and sometimes mutilated 12 or more women in Riverside County between June 28, 1989, and December 23, 1991. On January 9, 1992, Suff was arrested after a routine traffic stop when a police officer found a bloody knife and objects believed to be related to the killings.

Suff was working as a warehouse clerk for Riverside County when he was arrested, having been hired while still on parole from Texas. During his time in this job, Suff delivered office furniture to the officers on the task force who were investigating his killing spree.

== Trial ==
On July 19, 1995, a Riverside County jury found Suff guilty of killing 12 women and attempting to kill another, though police suspected him of being responsible for as many as 22 deaths. Suff did not testify in his defense. During the penalty phase that followed, the prosecutor presented evidence linking Suff to the 1988 murder of a San Bernardino woman as well as evidence that, despite his prior Texas prison term for murdering his first daughter, he abused and violently shook his three-month-old daughter by his second wife. On August 17, 1995, after deliberating for only 10 minutes, the jury returned verdicts of guilty on 12 murder counts and on one count of attempted murder.

The jury could not unanimously agree to find him guilty on a 13th count of murder. On October 26, 1995, the trial court followed the jury's verdict and ordered Suff condemned to death. Suff resides on death row at San Quentin State Prison.

His 2014 appeal of the sentence was rejected by the California Supreme Court, which upheld the death penalty.

In August 2024, the Los Angeles County Sheriff's Department announced that Suff was linked to the murder of 19-year-old Cathy Ann Small, a resident of Lake Elsinore whose body was found in South Pasadena in 1986. Police are also searching for a second suspect they believe might be involved in the case.

== Victims ==
Confirmed
Name	Age	Date found	Outcome and cause of death
Dijiania Suff	2 months	September 25, 1973	died; beaten, with a history of abuse
Cathy Ann Small	19	February 22, 1986	died; strangled and stabbed
Rhonda Jetmore	27	January 10, 1989	survived
Kimberly Lyttle	28	June 28, 1989	died; strangled
Christina Leal	23	December 13, 1989	died; strangled and stabbed
Darla Jane Ferguson	23	January 18, 1990	died; strangled
Carol Lynn Miller	35	February 9, 1990	died; smothered
Cheryl Coker	33	November 6, 1990	died; strangled
Susan Melissa Sternfeld	27	December 21, 1990	died; strangled
Kathleen Leslie Milne	42	January 19, 1991	died; strangled and asphyxiated with a sock
Sherry Ann Latham	37	July 4, 1991	died; strangled
Kelly Marie Hammond	27	August 16, 1991	died; strangled and possible opiate intoxication
Catherine McDonald	30	September 13, 1991	died; stabbed and neck compression
Delliah Zamora	35	October 30, 1991	died; strangled
Eleanor Casares	39	December 23, 1991	died; stabbed and strangled

Suspected
Name	Age	Date found	Outcome and cause of death
Michelle Yvette Gutierrez	26	October 29, 1986	died; unknown
Charlotte Jean Palmer	25	December 10, 1986	died; possibly smothered
Linda Ann Ortega	37	April 29, 1988	died; stabbed
Martha Bess Young	27	May 2, 1988	died; strangled and overdose of amphetamines
Diane Mae Talavera	37	January 17, 1989	died; strangled
Judy Lynn Angel	36	November 11, 1989	died; blunt force trauma
Cherie Michelle Payseur	24	April 27, 1991	died; possible suffocation

== Books and TV ==
The Riverside Killer by Christine Keers and Dennis St Pierre was published in 1996 by Pinnacle True Crime.

In 1997 Cat and Mouse - Mind Games with a Serial Killer was published by Dove Books. Suff met with author Brian Alan Lane and told his story. The book includes short stories and poems written by Suff and photos of several of his victims.

Suff is the subject of the television program Real Detective. The 40-minute program includes dramatic recreations and interviews with the lead detective of the Riverside Taskforce, Det. Bob Creed. The episode first aired on March 9, 2017. He is also profiled as part of the 2013 Amazon Prime documentary Serial Killers Defined.

The case was the subject of episodes of The New Detectives, Born to Kill?, and Most Evil Killers.

== See also ==
- List of death row inmates in the United States
- List of serial killers by number of victims
- List of serial killers in the United States
