= 2016 Mukilteo shooting =

Mass shooting in Washington, U.S.

- Location: Mukilteo, Washington, U.S.
- Date: July 30, 2016 c. 12:00 a.m. (PDT)
- Attack type: Mass shooting
- Weapon: Ruger AR-556 semi-automatic rifle
- Deaths: 3
- Injuries: 1
- Perpetrator: Allen Christopher Ivanov
- Motive: Jealousy over a recent breakup

On July 30, 2016, a mass shooting occurred during a house party held by students of the University of Washington and Kamiak High School in the community of Mukilteo. Three people were killed and a fourth was injured. Afterwards, the gunman fled the scene.

Ninety minutes after the shooting, a suspect, identified as 19-year-old Allen Christopher Ivanov, was arrested near Chehalis. On August 2, he was charged with aggravated murder, attempted murder, and assault; and he pleaded not guilty to all of the charges on August 22. On December 19, 2016, to avoid the death penalty, Ivanov waived his right to appeal his sentence and pleaded guilty to the killings. On January 12, 2017, Ivanov was sentenced to life imprisonment without the possibility of parole.

The shooting led to calls for gun control in Washington state.

== Shooting ==
Before the shooting, a house party was being held in Mukilteo. About fifteen to twenty university and high school students, most of them graduates, were in attendance. The gunman arrived at the party at around 10:00 p.m. and observed the party unarmed.

After some time, he retrieved his rifle, crept around the side of the house, and concealed himself along a wall near the living room. He was discovered by Jacob Long, who he shot and killed just after midnight. Long was hit three times in the back after saying "no, no, no". He collapsed and died next to the pathway on the ground. Ivanov continued firing outside, wounding Will Kramer but Kramer was able to escape by crawling away. Attention turned towards Jordan Ebner who was also shot outside. Ivanov then walked in through patio doors to where Anna Bui was sitting at a kitchen table. He shot her multiple times point blank with some shots hitting her face. Afterwards, the gunman went upstairs to a balcony on the master bedroom, and began firing down onto two men, grazing the leg of the young man whose parents owned the house. The two men escaped.

During the shooting, some survivors hid and contacted their relatives. A total of three people were killed and a fourth person was injured.

Right after the shooting, the suspect fled the house after realizing he had run out of ammunition. Local detectives tracked him down by pinging his cellphone and contacting the Washington State Patrol for assistance. Ninety minutes later, he was arrested without incident by state troopers on an interstate near Chehalis, over 100 miles (160 km) away from the crime scene. An AR-15-type rifle and two 30-round magazines were recovered from his vehicle.

The whole shooting lasted about 35 seconds.

== Perpetrator and victims ==
=== Perpetrator ===
Allen Christopher Ivanov (born September 14, 1996), a 19-year-old software engineer and student at the University of Washington Bothell, was identified as the suspect in the shooting. Days before the shooting, he made troubling posts on his Twitter account and also posted Instagram photos of a rifle and three bullets. He was reportedly familiar to those who attended the party. According to a LinkedIn profile, Ivanov attended Kamiak High School from 2011 to 2015, and was the founder of a company that described itself as "an open source laser tag system".

About a week before the shooting, Ivanov purchased the rifle he used, and then purchased a second magazine on the day prior. According to court documents, right before committing the shooting, Ivanov read the rifle's manual. He also sent text messages to his friends, including one in Tennessee, alluding to his plans to commit a mass shooting a couple of days beforehand, calling himself a "future shooter". Police say he was motivated by the recent breakup between him and one of the victims, and his anger that his ex-girlfriend seemed to be moving along in her life.

=== Victims ===
The victims were identified as:

- Maria "Anna" Bui, 19, a University of Washington Bothell student from Everett, who was also reportedly Ivanov's ex-girlfriend.
- Jordan Michael Ebner, 19, of Lake Stevens.
- Jacob Michael "Jake" Long, 19, of Everett.
- Will Kramer, 18, a University of Washington student from Mukilteo who was seriously injured and taken to Harborview Medical Center for treatment. He was released from the hospital on August 15.

== Legal proceedings ==
After his arrest, police said Ivanov confessed to committing the shooting, but initially added that it was an accident, and that he had been confused that night and therefore not thinking straight. He was held in Snohomish County Jail on suspicion of one count of aggravated first-degree murder, two counts of first-degree murder, and one count of attempted first-degree murder.

During a court appearance on August 1, Ivanov's lawyer questioned the ease of his client to legally purchase an AR-15 with a high-capacity magazine while he is still not legally able to drink alcohol. Ivanov was not granted bail. On the next day, he was charged with three counts of aggravated first-degree murder, one count of attempted murder, and one charge of first-degree assault. On August 22, he pleaded not guilty to all of the charges. His next court appearance was scheduled on December 19. On that day, Ivanov pleaded guilty to the killings, reportedly before prosecutors had made a decision on whether or not to pursue a death sentence against him. On January 12, 2017, he was sentenced to life imprisonment without the possibility of parole. Ivanov is currently imprisoned in the Stafford Creek Corrections Center.

== Reactions ==
Mayor Jennifer Gregerson said that the Mukilteo community was "shaken to its core". Governor Jay Inslee sent his condolences to the victims' families and the survivors, praised the actions of law enforcement, and declared his support for Mukilteo during the investigation. The University of Washington also released a statement in reaction to the shooting.

A total of 200 people attended a vigil at Kamiak High School on the day after the shooting. Another vigil was held at a local church, which was attended by 800 people, including Governor Inslee, who made a statement mentioning gun violence in the country. The flags at Mukilteo City Hall were lowered to half-mast. On August 26, people familiar with the victims gathered to organize a benefit concert for their families.

Following the shooting, an alliance, titled Mukilteo Strong Alliance, was formed by Mukilteo residents. Its plans were to create a permanent memorial in honor of the victims, as well as finding ways for the community to heal and move forward. Its first meeting was held on September 20 and attended by family and friends of the victims, non-profit organizations, and counselors.

On September 7, Washington Attorney General Bob Ferguson cited the shooting when he called on the Washington State Legislature to pass a state law barring the sales of assault weapons like the one used in the shooting, restricting magazines carrying over ten rounds, and requiring persons buying ammunition to undergo a background check, saying such a measure "will save lives". The parents of injured victim Will Kramer, who are supporters of a Washington-based gun control advocacy group, urged people to remember the victims of gun violence and for lawmakers to support Ferguson's proposal. The proposal received opposition from the National Rifle Association of America.
