= Baby Teeth (band) =

Indie pop/rock band based in Chicago

- Origin: Chicago, Illinois, U.S.
- Genres: Indie rock, pop
- Years active: 2003–present
- Label: Lujo Records
- Members: Abraham Levitan; Jim Cooper; Peter Andreadis
- Website: https://www.babyteeth.band/

Baby Teeth is an American pop/rock band formed in 2003 and based in Chicago, Illinois. Baby Teeth was formed in 2003 by vocalist and keyboard player Abraham Levitan, and also features Jim Cooper on bass and drummer Peter Andreadis The band integrates "FM-era pop, from glam to power pop". To date, the band has released five albums: their eponymous The Baby Teeth Album (2005), The Simp (2007), Hustle Beach (2009), White Tonight (2012), and Carry on Regardless (2023).

== Biography ==
Baby Teeth was formed in 2003 by vocalist and keyboard player Abraham Levitan, who has also used the stage name 'Pearly Sweets'. Levitan was the former leader of The Platonics and a member of Bobby Conn and The Glass Gypsies. Bassist Jim Cooper was the longtime leader of Chicago band Detholz! and also played with Bobby Conn's band with Levitan. Drummer Peter Andreadis was the leader of Chicago band All City Affairs.

Baby Teeth's first album, The Baby Teeth Album, was released in 2005, with critics noting a 70s soft rock sound.

The band's sophomore record The Simp was released in 2007, drawing comparisons to 70s rock, including Elton John and Creedence Clearwater Revival.

2009's Hustle Beach earned the band a positive review on Pitchfork with a rating of 7.1. Reviewer Eric Harvey noted "simple arrangements, sticky melodies, and hooks."

2012's White Tonight marked Baby Teeth's final album before they disbanded.

2023's Carry on Regardless marked the group's first recording since they reunited for live gigs in 2018. The Chicago Reader described the record as "radio-ready pop whose dextrous arrangements and sublime hooks recall classic 70s albums from the likes of Supertramp or Chicago."

== Members ==
- Abraham Levitan – lead vocals, keyboards
- Jim Cooper – bass guitar, vocals
- Peter Andreadis – drums, vocals

== Discography ==
=== Albums ===
- The Baby Teeth Album (2005)
- The Simp (2007)
- Hustle Beach (2009)
- White Tonight (2012)
- Carry on Regardless (2023)

=== Singles ===
- "The Baby Teeth Single" (2003)
- "Hustle Beach Single" (2009)
- "Dripping Candle" (2019)
- "Don't Go Outside" (2022)

=== EPs ===
- For The Heathers (2006)
- Boss (2011)

=== Other ===
- 52 Teeth (2007–08) – Collection of new songs released once a week for a year
