= Kamiak High School =

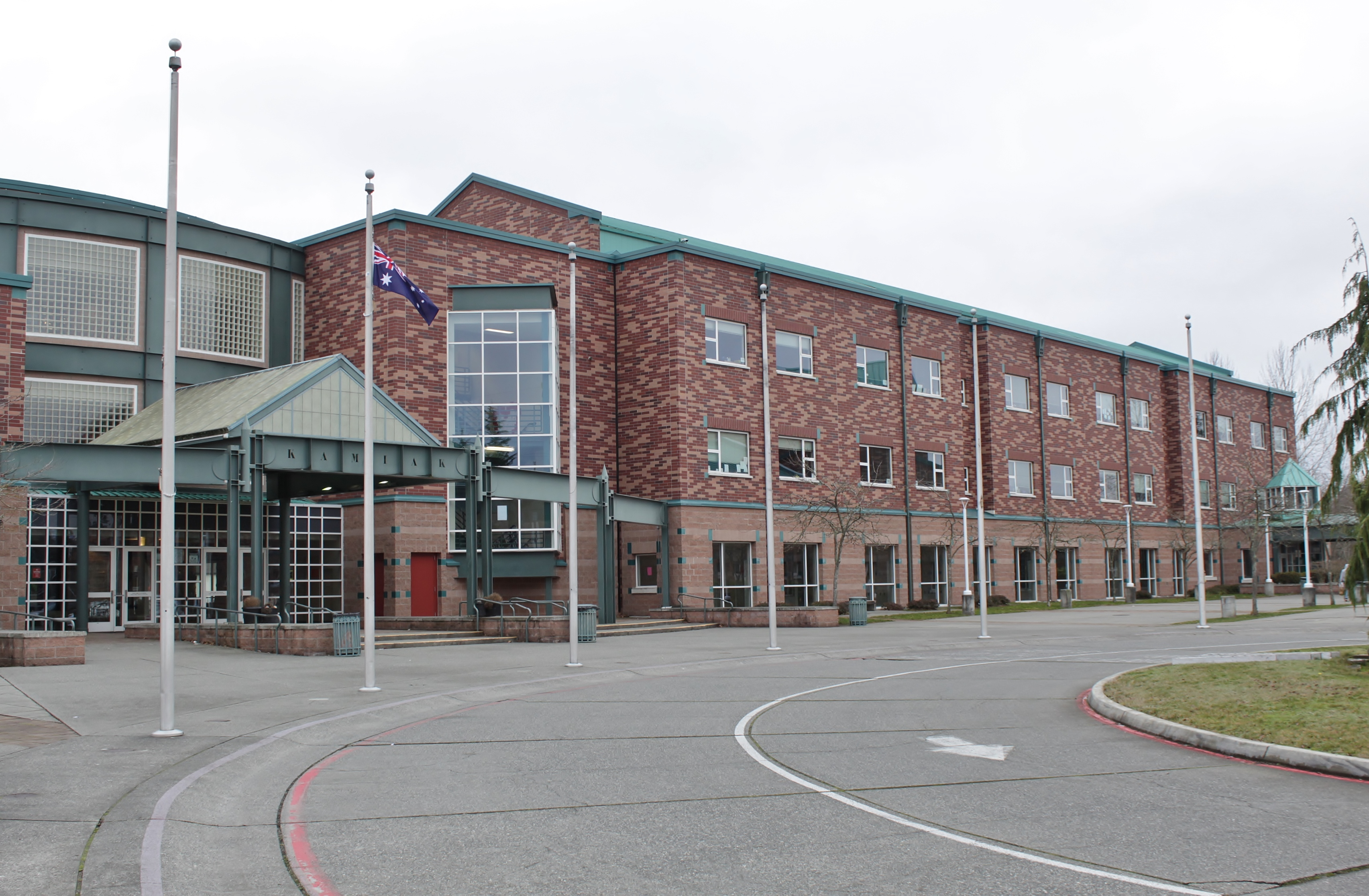

Location
- 10801 Harbour Pointe Boulevard; Mukilteo, Washington 98275; United States; 47°54′04″N 122°18′07″W

Information
- Type: Public
- Established: September 8, 1993
- School district: Mukilteo School District
- NCES School ID: 530543001188
- Principal: Stephen Shurtleff
- Teaching staff: 93.50 (FTE)
- Grades: 9–12
- Enrollment: 2,382 (2023-2024)
- Student to teacher ratio: 25.48
- Colors: Purple, Silver & White
- Athletics conference: Wesco 4A
- Mascot: Knights
- Newspaper: The Gauntlet
- Website: ka.mukilteoschools.org

Kamiak High School is a public high school in Mukilteo, Washington, United States. It was the second high school in the Mukilteo School District when it opened on September 8, 1993. The first and only high school within Mukilteo city limits, it was built to accommodate the overflow population from the overcrowded Mariner High School in the neighboring city of Everett.

Kamiak's campus features over 40 classrooms, a physical education complex with two separate gymnasiums and a weight room, a half-Olympic sized swimming pool complex, a Performing Arts Center (known as "The PAC"), a number of portables, six tennis courts, a softball field, baseball field, soccer field, football field, track facilities, and the school's East Campus, which houses science and math rooms as well as a third gymnasium (Multi-Purpose room) used as a secondary cafeteria.

== History ==
When Mariner High School opened on January 10, 1971, it was the only high school serving the Mukilteo School District. While the district waited for 84 years before opening Mariner, it dealt with substantial growth in enrollment between the openings of Mariner and Kamiak; from 1982 to 1992, the district student count had grown by 84 percent, with the district building one school per year from 1984 onward. With the growth far outstripping available capacity at Mariner, it was apparent that an additional high school was needed to handle future secondary students.

Construction of Kamiak was initially funded via a $66.7 million levy approved by voters in 1989; an additional $89.5 million was approved in 1992. The cost of construction was projected at $32 million, with another $13 million dedicated to the construction of the adjacent Harbour Pointe Middle School. The opening of both schools was threatened by contract negotiations between the district and its teachers, but a potential strike was averted when both sides agreed to a three-year contract; both schools opened as planned on September 8, 1993. Kamiak opened without a senior class for the 1993–94 school year.

=== Firecrackers ===
On November 23, 2015, Kamiak was involved in a school shooting scare when it was put under lockdown after a teacher called 9-1-1 around 9:38 AM, reporting that she heard gunshots near her third-floor classroom. Neighboring schools Columbia Elementary and Harbour Pointe Middle were also placed under lockdown as a precaution. Mukilteo police responded to the scene with assistance from multiple law enforcement agencies, which included the Washington State Patrol and the Snohomish County Sheriff's Office as well as the police departments of Edmonds, Everett, Lynnwood, and Mill Creek; an Everett officer was involved in a rear-end collision with another driver on SR 526 at its eastern terminus while responding to the incident. Officers at the scene found residue from two firecrackers in a stairwell between the second and third floors, conducting a full sweep of the campus after the discovery. The lockdown was lifted around 1:10 PM, lasting more than three hours in duration.

=== Joshua O'Connor ===
Just more than two years later, Kamiak was involved in another shooting scare when former student Joshua Alexander O'Connor was arrested on February 13, 2018, in connection with a plot to shoot up ACES Alternative High, his then-current school. O'Connor's initial target in the plot was Kamiak, where he was suspended twice while attending there; he later switched his target to ACES after conducting a coin flip to decide between the two schools. O'Connor was ultimately thwarted when his grandmother discovered the plot while going through his journal and called 9-1-1 to report it; he pled guilty to all charges brought against him on December 7 and was subsequently sentenced to 22½ years in prison on February 28, 2019.

== Academics ==
The school offers 21 Advanced Placement courses: Calculus AB, Calculus BC, Statistics, English Language and Composition, English Literature and Composition, Computer Science, Biology, Chemistry, Physics C: Mechanics, Physics C: Electricity and Magnetism, European History, Human Geography, US Government and Politics, World History, US History, French Language and Culture, German Language and Culture, Japanese Language and Culture, Music Theory, Studio Art: 2D Design Portfolio, and Studio Art: Drawing Portfolio, as well as a number of honors courses.

== Athletics ==
The school is part of District One of the Washington Interscholastic Activities Association (WIAA). With over 2,000 students enrolled, Kamiak is classified as a Wesco 4A member under WIAA guidelines. Their main rival in athletics is Mariner High School, the other high school in the Mukilteo School District. Sports offered include:

- Freshmen and Varsity Football
- Girls' JV and Varsity Soccer
- Girls' Swim
- Girls' Dive
- Girls' Freshmen, JV, and Varsity Volleyball
- Cross Country
- Boys' JV and Varsity Tennis
- Boys' Freshmen, JV, and Varsity Basketball
- Girls' Freshmen, JV, and Varsity Basketball
- Wrestling
- Boys' Swim
- Boys' Dive
- Boys' JV and Varsity Baseball
- Girls' JV and Varsity Softball
- Boys' and Girls' Track
- Girls' JV and Varsity Tennis
- Boys' JV and Varsity Soccer
- Boys' Varsity Golf
- Girls' JV and Varsity Golf
- Dance
- Cheerleading
- Boys' and Girls' Lacrosse JV & Varsity [Club sport]
- Marching/Show Band

== Notable alumni ==
- Jean-Luc Baker (2012), ice dancer and Olympian
- Sean Beighton (2007), Olympic curling coach and former curler
- Thomas Erak (2003), lead vocalist, guitarist, and keyboardist for the band The Fall of Troy, which formed during their time at Kamiak
- Andrew Forsman (2004), drummer and percussionist for the progressive rock band The Fall of Troy
- Marko Liias (1999), the Democratic member of the Washington State Senate, representing the 21st legislative district
- Tim Ward (2003), bass guitarist and screamed vocalist for the progressive rock band The Fall of Troy, which produced a single for Guitar Hero III: Legends of Rock
- Ron Watkins (2005), conspiracy theorist, former 8chan administrator, and alleged author of QAnon posts

== Notable faculty ==
- Chance McKinney (until 2010), Country musician and winner of CMT's Music City Madness Competition

== See also ==
- List of high schools in Washington (state)
- 2016 Mukilteo shooting
