= Detholz! =

US musical group

Detholz! are a Chicago-based band consisting of Jim Cooper, Charlie Towns, Jon Steinmeier, Andrew Sole and Benjamin Miranda. While the eclectic nature of their songs prevent a definitive categorization, they are frequently listed as an alternative rock or a new wave outfit, and Devo is often cited as an influence. Formed in 1996, the band has attracted a loyal following in Chicago. One distinguishing feature of the band is the idiosyncratic nature of their lyrics that have—and are often critical of—religious (mostly Protestant evangelical Christian) themes and reference a wide variety of topics including artificial intelligence, psychoanalysis, televangelism, and Mars.

== History ==
The band was formed at Wheaton College, an evangelical Christian college in 1996, according to the band's official bio.

In the summer of 1997, Detholz! (known as "The Detholz!" at the time) broke up when front man Jim Cooper, upon graduating from Wheaton College, left for Los Angeles, California, to study with composer Morton Subotnick and pursue a graduate degree in electronic music composition at Calarts school. Cooper left after one semester, however, frustrated with the school's faculty and his student peers. The band reformed upon his returning to the Chicago area in early 1998.

In February 2005, the band was handpicked by Jeff Tweedy of Chicago band Wilco to open for them on a U.S. tour. He tapped them to open for them again in November 2006, in Madison and Chicago.

On March 19, 2011, Detholz! released their latest album Death to the Traitor at the Hideout in Chicago, Illinois.

== Pronunciation ==
"Detholz!" is pronounced as "Death Holes." An individual member of the band is referred to as a "Dethole," similarly pronounced as "Death Hole." The band previously used the word "The" at the beginning of their name, but they have recently abandoned it, as is clear on their official website and MySpace page.

== Discography ==
- Science of the Senses (1997)
- Employee Primer (1999)
- Who are the Detholz!? (2002)
- Egg EP (2004)
- Jukebox of the Dead (2005)
- Relics (2006 compilation of tracks recorded between 1996 and 2003)
- Cast Out Devils (2006)
- Jukebox of the Dead Vol. II: You the Power of You (2008)
- Death to the Traitor (2011)

== Other media ==
- Members of Detholz! are featured in the documentary Why Should the Devil Have All the Good Music? out on Secretly Canadian/Blank Stare (January 2006). The film is about Christian rock and features interviews with members of the band, plus a brief performance clip. A more complete edit of the Detholz! interview is included in the DVD extras.

== Collaborations ==
- Members of Detholz! have played with other prominent Chicago musicians. Keyboardist Jon Steinmeier performed with Mavis Staples regularly in 2004. Frontman Jim Cooper plays bass guitar in Chicago trio, Baby Teeth. Steinmeier, Cooper and Detholz! guitarist Charlie Towns have played in Bobby Conn's band from 2005–present.
- Frontman Jim Cooper was a founding member of the DC hardcore band, Frodus.

• Previous and guest musicians / participants have varied greatly through the years and have included
