= To Bed to Battle =

To Bed To Battle

Studio album by Look Mexico
- Released: March 23, 2010
- Genres: Indie rock, emo
- Length: 38:09
- Label: Suburban Home Records

Look Mexico chronology
The Crucial Collection (2008)	To Bed To Battle (2010)	Uniola (2016)

To Bed To Battle is the second studio album by indie rock band Look Mexico. It was released on March 23, 2010.

== Track listing ==
1. "You Stay. I Go. No Following." - 3:41
2. "No Wonder I'm Still Awake" - 4:38
3. "Take It Upstairs, Einstein" - 2:56
4. "I Live My Life a Quarter Mile at a Time" - 3:28
5. "Until the Lights Burn Out?" - 4:55
6. "They Offered Me a Deal (I Said No, Naturally)" - 2:41
7. "Get In There, Brother!" - 2:32
8. "They Only Take the Backroads" - 3:33
9. "Time For You to Go Do Your Own Thing" - 2:58
10. "Just Like Old Times" - 6:51
