= Mukilteo School District =

Public school system in Mukilteo, Washington, U.S. and surrounding areas

Address
- 9401 Sharon Drive Everett, Washington, 98204; United States
- Coordinates: 47.9128°N 122.2442°W

District information
- Type: Public
- Grades: Pre-K–12
- Established: 1878; 148 years ago
- Superintendent: Dr. Alison Brynelson
- Governing agency: Washington State Office of Superintendent of Public Instruction
- Schools: 24
- Budget: $314.6 million (2023-24)
- NCES District ID: 5305430

Students and staff
- Students: 15,270 (2023-24)
- Teachers: 883.10 (2023–24)
- Staff: 1,694.06 (2023-24)
- Student–teacher ratio: 17.29 (2023-24)
- Athletic conference: WIAA

Other information
- Website: www.mukilteoschools.org

Mukilteo School District No. 6 is a public school district that mainly serves Mukilteo, Washington. The Mukilteo School District includes all of the city, but also a portion of south Everett, Lynnwood, and Edmonds. The district had more than 15,200 students in 2023–24 and a budget of approximately $314 million.

== History ==
Organized in 1878, the district has two high schools, one alternative high school, four middle schools, 12 elementary schools, and one kindergarten-only school. It also administers an Everett-based technical high school serving surrounding school districts. It is the sixth oldest district in the state.

The school district had no high school until the opening of Mariner High School in 1970. Prior to that, students from tenth grade onwards had to attend Cascade High School or Everett High School in the neighboring Everett School District. While the lack of a high school led to attempts in 1916 and 1959 to merge the district into the Everett district, both attempts failed; the latter involved the passage of bonds to fund the district's share in the construction of Cascade. The Emander school district, founded in 1919 and consisting of a one-room schoolhouse located near the future site of Mariner High School, was consolidated into the Mukilteo district in 1945; this expanded the latter's service area into what would become south Everett.

With the opening of Kamiak High School in 1993, the district switched from junior high to middle schools, adding two of the latter in the process. As a result, sixth grade was moved from elementary to middle school while ninth grade was moved from junior high to high school.

The school district had a teachers' strike of 33 days in 1990, pushing the last day of school for the 1990–91 school year to July 2. This was resolved using collaborative bargaining. A three-year contract was signed and school councils were established to continue the process of collaboration.

Amid the controversy over then-ongoing nationwide book banning efforts, the district's board of education elected to take To Kill a Mockingbird off of the required reading list for students in January 2022 due to concerns over its handling of various racial issues; as the book was not banned by the district, teachers still have the option to include it as part of their curriculum.

== Operations ==
=== Boundary ===
The district boundary includes the entirety of Mukilteo, a portion of Everett, Picnic Point, the majority of Lake Stickney, and a portion of Martha Lake.

=== Transportation ===
The school district operates its own fleet of school buses, roughly half of which consist of Blue Bird buses. As part of a delivery in 2013 for an order with 12 other Blue Bird buses, a 2014 All American RE intended for the district marked a milestone of 550,000 buses manufactured by the company.

== 2018 teacher salary controversy ==
In April 2018, in response to the State of Washington allocating $1 billion to school districts in order to comply with the McCleary ruling, the Mukilteo Education Association sent a formal demand for bargain. The school district refused to bargain with the union, saying that it was a "closed contract". In a statement issued by school board president John Gahagan, he said the board would be willing to "meet and confer". However, in their May 29, 2018, board meeting, MEA president Dana Wiebe said this wasn't enough citing the school district backing out of previous discussions. In response to the school district's refusal to allocate funds, teachers from Mariner High School have been staging informational pickets on the street in front of Mariner during their lunch breaks and continue to do so for the remainder of the school year. They have also asked for the support of community members and students who packed the May 29, 2018 meeting and spoke to the board for nearly an hour. It has been leaked that the teachers of the school district are planning on going on strike and students will miss a month or two of school if they officially go on strike. Sadly for the students, if the strikeout does happen the time will be added to the school year.

== Superintendents ==
During the 1990 strike, Superintendent James Shoemake and the school board conducted actions considered detrimental to the negotiation process with the district teachers' union. Such actions included planning to commence the school year with substitute teachers, spending about $50,000 on advertisements advocating their own position, accusing the state teachers' union of involvement in the strike, and marking blue lines in front of all district schools. While close to 75 percent of teachers initially approved the strike, Shoemake demanded a vote by the teachers on the district's offer, claiming that the union leaders inaccurately represented the teachers; 94 percent of the teachers subsequently rejected the offer. Shoemake, having moved from Joplin, Missouri, in 1987, was accused of anti-union practices based on the influence of Missouri's right-to-work law.

In 1996, Gary Toothaker was hired as the district superintendent, having held a similar position at Helena Public School District in Montana before taking the Mukilteo job. In May 2001, Toothaker reached a settlement with the Washington State Public Disclosure Commission over accusations of him allowing the distribution of items promoting the district's 2000 bond and levy proposals, agreeing to pay a fine of $7,000. Just more than a year later, Toothaker resigned in October 2002 over allegations of an affair with an unmarried school administrator, with board members concerned about his potential favoritism towards the administrator; Toothaker subsequently filed for divorce the following month. The superintendent position was filled on an interim basis by Fred Poss until Marci Larsen, an administrator who had joined the district in 2000, was appointed on July 1, 2003. Larsen would serve as superintendent until her retirement on December 31, 2019; deputy superintendent Alison Brynelson took over the position the following day.

== Schools ==
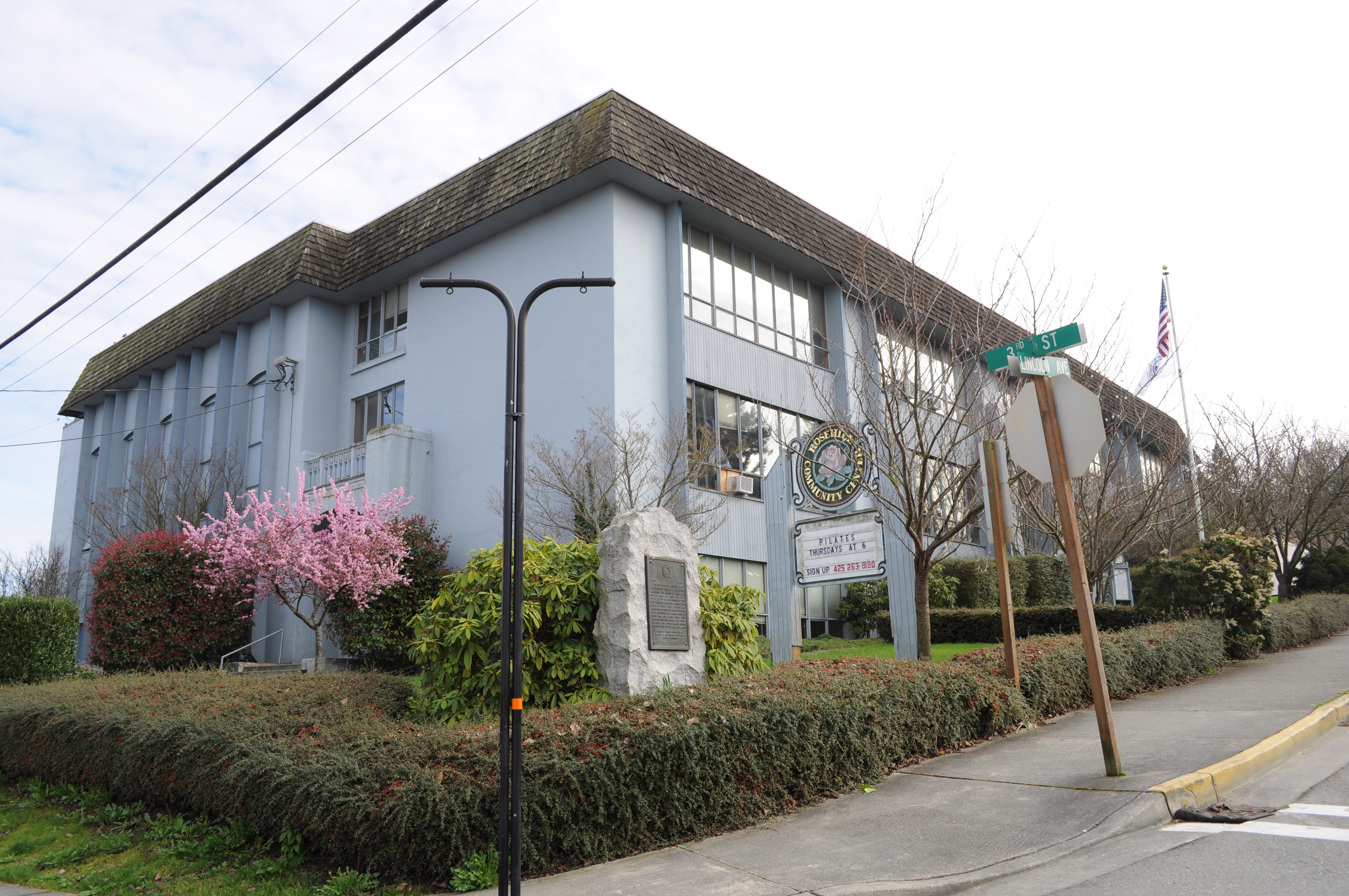
The former Rosehill School in the center of Mukilteo

=== High schools ===
- ACES/Big Picture High School
- Kamiak High School
- Mariner High School

=== Middle schools ===
- Explorer Middle School
- Harbour Pointe Middle School
- Olympic View Middle School
- Voyager Middle School

=== Elementary schools ===
- Challenger Elementary School
- Columbia Elementary School
- Discovery Elementary School
- Endeavour Elementary School
- Fairmount Elementary School
- Horizon Elementary School
- Lake Stickney Elementary School
- Mukilteo Elementary School
- Odyssey Elementary School
- Olivia Park Elementary School
- Picnic Point Elementary School
- Serene Lake Elementary School

=== Kindergarten schools ===
- Pathfinder Kindergarten Center

=== Other schools ===
- Sno-Isle Tech Skills Center
- ECEAP (Early Childhood Education and Assistance Program)

== Incidents ==
During a planned remodel, a welder's torch caught one of the older buildings on fire on May 5, 2009. This building was largely destroyed by the fire, with classes relocated and continued. The skills center fully re-opened for classes in September 2010.

On December 4, 2023, Endeavour Elementary was significantly damaged by a fire that occurred in the ceiling of a hallway near the office and library; the school sustained smoke and water damage as well as some destroyed trusses. The school district elected to administer distance education for Endeavour students while the extent of the damage was assessed.

=== Averted ACES/Kamiak shooting plot ===
On the morning of February 13, 2018, a day before the Stoneman Douglas High School shooting, Catherine Katsel-O'Connor called 9-1-1 to report her discovery of some journal entries of her grandson, Joshua Alexander O'Connor. In the journal, O'Connor wrote down plans to shoot up ACES Alternative High School, where he was attending; he also wrote of his possession of a Hi-Point carbine rifle in his guitar case, which Katsel-O'Connor found. O'Connor was removed from class and arrested by the Everett Police Department later that day; while in custody, he attempted to escape an officer and kicked him as he caught up to him. In his plans, O'Connor initially targeted Kamiak High School, where he was suspended twice; he later picked ACES after performing a coin flip to decide between Kaimak and ACES as the target. The shooting was to occur on April 20 to coincide with the Columbine High School massacre.

O'Connor was charged with attempted first-degree murder, third-degree assault, and first-degree robbery, the latter of which was that of a convenience store performed by him and another classmate the previous day and which prosecutors assumed he planned to fund his attack with the proceeds from. The assault charge was later dropped in favor of a charge of illegal possession of an explosive device. O'Connor initially pleaded not guilty to all charges, but later changed his mind and pleaded guilty to all charges on December 7; he was subsequently sentenced to 22½ years in prison on February 28, 2019.
