= Mouse Fire =

Dance-rock band from Tampa, Florida

- Origin: Tampa, Florida, United States
- Genres: Dance-rock
- Years active: 2006–present
- Labels: Lujo Records
- Members: Joey Bruce; Shane Schuch; Justin Cason; Aaron Venrick
- Website: MouseFireMusic.com

Mouse Fire is a U.S. independent dance-rock band from Tampa, Florida. They formed in 2006 and released their debut album Wooden Teeth in October 2007 to critical acclaim. The band took a brief hiatus from national touring to play locally and write/record their sophomore full-length album, Big Emotion released in June 2010. Both records were released on Lujo Records.

== History ==
Mouse Fire was formed in 2006 as a quartet comprising Joey Bruce, Shane Schuch, Aaron Venrick and Justin Carson who came out of several Florida bands. Joey Bruce met Shane Schuch in 1990s while Bruce was playing in SaGoh 24/7 and Schuch was playing with Atomsmashers Named Suzie; Carson is a cousin of Bruce and Venrick knew Bruce at high school. Their album Wooden Teeth was released in November 2007 by Lujo Records. Stewart Mason writing in AllMusic described it as "a solid, encouraging debut."

Joey Bruce, the lead singer, left the band in February 2008 to focus on family and other projects and Shane Schuch took over the singing and continued to write new songs. The band released their second album Big Emotion in June 2010. The new album was described by the Oklahoma Gazette as "a resolutely dance-floor-ready sound combining bristling funk backbeat, shimmying synth lines and big, harmonic vocal hooks that hark back to Hall & Oates, Air Supply and Chicago… graceful, pretty and foot-tapping."

== Members ==
Current

- Shane Schuch – lead vocals, lead guitar
- Justin Cason – bass, backing vocals
- Aaron Venrick – drums

Former

- Joey Bruce – lead vocals, guitar (2006–2008)
- Cory Carmichael - bass guitar, (2006)

== Discography ==
=== Studio albums ===
- 2007: Wooden Teeth
- 2010: Big Emotion
