= The Crucial Collection =

Compilation album by Look Mexico
- Released: February 12, 2008
- Recorded: 2004–2007
- Genre: Indie rock Post-rock
- Length: 49:32
- Label: Lujo Records lujo057

Look Mexico chronology
This Is Animal Music (2007)	The Crucial Collection (2008)	To Bed to Battle (2010)

The Crucial Collection is a compilation album by Look Mexico, released on February 12, 2008 on Lujo Records. The disc re-releases the songs found on The Crucial EP (where the album's name is taken from) and the So Byzantine EP, and a selection of b-sides and remixes, as well as revised versions of songs taken from their debut, This Is Animal Music, with a more polished-sounding mix.

== Track listing ==
1. "He Bit Me" – 1:28
2. "I Can't Today, I'm On Duty" – 2:56
3. "Call Off Your Lapdog" – 2:47
4. "Guys, I Need a Helicopter" – 4:45
5. "Come On, We Are Talking About You Here" – 2:59
6. "Whose Ship Is This?" – 4:12
7. "Oh, The Things I'm Gonna Do For My Country" – 5:7
8. "Variations On a Theme (Guys, I Need a Helicopter)" – 3:20
9. "Math Is Everywhere" – 3:42
10. "I Meant Pushups" – 3:32
11. "Me And My Dad Built Her" (remix) – 2:39
12. "You Ever Get Punched In the Face For Talking Too Much?" (History Invades remix) – 3:17
13. "You Come Into My House, While I Sleep?" (Chris Rucker remix) – 4:36
14. "Done And Done" (The Dark Romantics remix) – 3:53
