= Thomas Erak =

American singer, songwriter, and musician (born 1985)

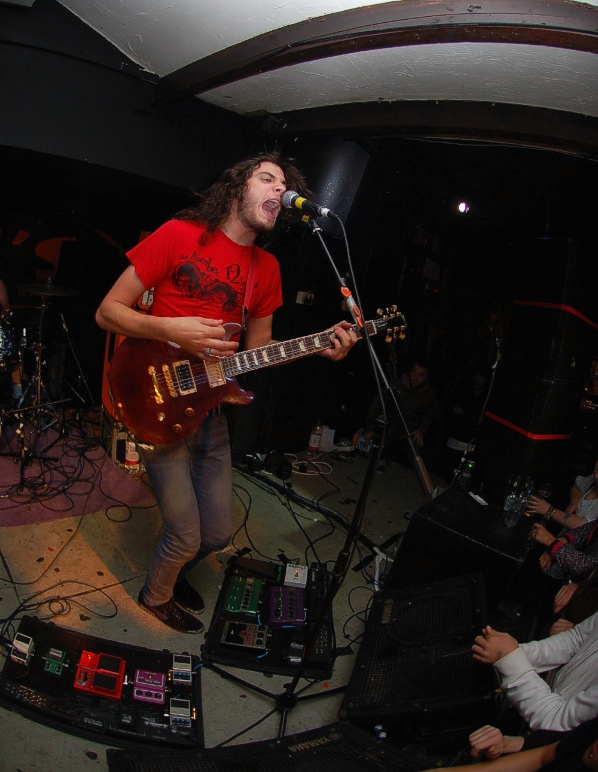

Background information
- Also known as: Thomas Erak and The Shoreline
- Born: Thomas Joseph Erak; March 7, 1985 (age 41)
- Origin: Mukilteo, Washington
- Genres: Post-hardcore; math rock; experimental rock; emo; progressive metal; mathcore
- Occupation: Musician
- Instruments: Vocals; guitar; keyboards; drums; bass
- Years active: 2002–present
- Labels: Equal Vision; Lujo; Razor & Tie
- Member of: The Fall of Troy; Push Over
- Formerly of: The Tribune; 30 Years War; The Monday Mornings; The Hills Have Eyes; Just Like Vinyl; Chiodos; Daydreamer; Royal Coda

Thomas Joseph Erak is an American singer, songwriter, and musician from Mukilteo, Washington, best known as a founding member of the Seattle-based progressive mathcore band The Fall of Troy, as a member of the band Just Like Vinyl, as well as his recent solo experiment Thomas Erak and The Shoreline. He is a former member of the band Chiodos.

== Early life and youth career ==
According to Thomas' appearance on the That One Time On Tour podcast, Thomas' father was a touring, for-hire bass player in the 70s and 80s, and helped him get into music as a young child. Initially, he began playing drums, often practicing music from jazz and funk greats like Miles Davis, Ray Charles, and James Brown. Later on, he picked up bass around the age of 7 and excelled at the instrument, learning entire songs by ear. At age 12, Thomas started playing guitar, often playing Nirvana and Green Day, before moving onto more technical music, such as Sunny Day Real Estate and Deftones, all of which he has claimed to be influences on his music career. Erak attended Kamiak High School and graduated in 2003. While there, he met fellow Fall of Troy member Andrew Forsman while participating in the Kamiak Show Band drumline. Along with classmates Mike Munro and Tim Ward, they formed a band called The 30 Years War. Munro left the band during their late high school years, and in 2003 the remaining members renamed the band to The Fall of Troy.

== Career ==
=== The Fall of Troy ===
After forming in 2003, while in high school, the band released their first album through Lujo Records. Erak remained with the band until their 2010 hiatus, and joined again in 2013 when the band announced its reunion. The band has since released OK in 2016 independently to critical and fan acclaim alike. The band had been hinting at new material in 2019 that eventually became 2020's Mukiltearth. The band announced a weekend of shows on the east coast, as well of a handful of shows in California to close out 2019, to garner attention for the aforementioned Mukiltearth. More recently, they played several shows across the United States for the 20th anniversary of their self titled album.

=== Just Like Vinyl ===
During The Fall of Troy's hiatus, Erak played in the rock band Just Like Vinyl. They released two albums that are still available, the first being self-titled and the second being Black Mass released by Superball Records. Erak has said in many interviews he believes that Black Mass is one of his personally favorite albums he has had a part in making. The band is currently on Hiatus as Erak works on new music/The Fall of Troy.

=== Chiodos ===
In 2012, Erak joined Chiodos as the lead guitarist and backup vocalist. He is featured on their 2014 album, Devil.

He left Chiodos on December 9, 2014 to focus on the next The Fall of Troy album.

=== Pushover ===
Erak and ex-Dance Gavin Dance singer Kurt Travis released a 3-song "Demo" in 2017 via Travis’ Esque records, and have been since rumored to have recorded a full-length LP that has yet to be released.

=== Other groups ===
During the Fall of Troy's original run, he was the lead vocalist in local Seattle Hardcore band "The Hills Have Eyes". He also spent a brief period of time as the drummer for The Monday Mornings. The Fall of Troy bandmate Andrew Forsman replaced him when he left. In early 2015, Erak performed with instrumental progressive rock band Chon at SXSW for Audiotree, and played a variety of songs from The Fall of Troy, Just Like Vinyl, and a cover of Nirvana's "Heart Shaped Box". Despite being called a one-of-a-kind performance, Erak has since played two other shows with Chon. At the Audiotree Music Festival 2016 in Kalamazoo, Michigan, members of Chon featured with The Fall of Troy in multiple songs. Then, on Chon's "Super Chon Bros" tour stop in Detroit, Michigan, Erak performed on Chon's song "Can't Wait" and the group proceeded to play The Fall of Troy's song "F.C.P.R.E.M.I.X."

In 2018 Erak released an EP titled The Whole Story under the name "Thomas Erak and The Shoreline" which was music all written and recorded by Erak himself with help from former bandmate Jake Carden of Just Like Vinyl, and a couple other friends. The EP was released by Blue Swan records. Interestingly, Erak recorded the music in a very difficult format where he would start with the drums and improvise drum tracks to a click track at a chosen tempo until the drums made a complete song. He would then repeat this with bass, guitars, and finally vocals. Erak stated in his biography "the making of the Whole Story" that he wanted to challenge himself, and used this opportunity as an experiment to "see if he could even do this by myself". While hearkening back to both his post-punk/hardcore and prog-rock roots with tracks like "Sick and Tired" and "Silver Tongue", The Whole Story is also full of experiments in genre for Erak that tend to be some of its most interesting moments. The EP explores genres yet unexplored by Erak in tracks such as "Payday Loans", an almost alt-country anthem, as well as in songs like "He Said, She Said", an almost straight-forward Pop-Rock tune, and "Heartpoon", a ballad. Erak said in the future he hopes to experiment more with "The Shoreline" moniker, but he has since been working on other projects.

In 2024 Erak released a single entitled "A.D.D.T.M (Attention Deficit Disorder of The Masses)" under the name "Thomas Erak & The Ouroboros". In 2025 he released a 13-song album titled "(AU)" under the same name.

== Personal life ==
In March 2023, Erak married his wife Katie. They live together with her son, Gabe.

== Discography ==
=== Studio albums ===
The Thirty Years' War

- Martyrs Among the Casualties EP (2002)

The Fall of Troy

- The Fall of Troy (2003)
- Ghostship EP/Demo (2004)
- Doppelgänger (2005)
- Manipulator (2007)
- Phantom on the Horizon EP (2008)
- In the Unlikely Event (2009)
- OK (2016)
- Mukiltearth (2020)

Just Like Vinyl

- Just Like Vinyl (2010)
- Black Mass (2012)

Thomas Erak & The Ouroboros

- (AU) (2025)

Chiodos

- Devil (2014)

Push Over

- Demo EP (2017)

Spit Spot

- Spit Spot (2017)

Solo Albums

- The Whole Story (EP) (2018)

=== Live albums ===
The Thirty Years' War

- Live at the Paradox (2002)

The Fall of Troy

- Live at the Boardwalk (2007)

=== Collaborations ===
- "I.D.F.A.R." (with Ashley Mendel and Ben Kenney)
- Multiple songs and features throughout The Woods Brothers' debut album. (Also featuring Casey Crescenzo of The Dear Hunter)

=== Guest appearances ===
- Fear Before
  - "Review Our Lives (Epic)" (2008)
