= DeWayne Lee Harris =

American serial killer (born 1963)

- Born: 1963 (age 62–63); Seattle, Washington, U.S.
- Other names: "The Seattle Jungle Killer" "Chilly Willy" “The Seattle Shoelace Slasher”
- Children: One daughter
- Conviction: First degree murder (3 counts)
- Penalty: 94 years imprisonment

Details
- Victims: 3+
- Span of crimes: 1997–1998
- Country: United States
- State: Washington
- Date apprehended: 1998
- Imprisoned at: Stafford Creek Corrections Center

DeWayne Lee Harris (born 1963), also known as The Seattle Jungle Killer or Chilly Willy, but most widely known as The Seattle Shoelace Slasher is an American serial killer who killed three women in Seattle between 1997 and 1998, dumping their bodies near freeways. While jailed for a robbery charge, he confessed to the murders and was later sentenced to 94 years imprisonment.

== Murders ==
The first victim was 42-year-old Denise Marie Harris (no relation), whom DeWayne met on First Avenue in downtown Seattle. Along with an unnamed accomplice, they strangled Denise with a belt, removing some of her clothing and then binding her hands and ankles with shoelaces. He also stuffed a brassiere in her mouth. Harris' body was then dumped in the "Jungle", an underdeveloped plot of land under the I-5 and I-90 freeways. Denise's body was found on September 12 by a transient man wandering the area.

Not long after, Harris picked up 33-year-old Antoinette Jones. He accused her of stealing drugs from him, and proceeded to strangle her with a leather belt. Like Denise, he then bound her wrists and ankles with shoelaces, wrapping an additional shoelace around her neck. Her body was dumped in the Jungle, where her skeletal remains were found on February 1, 1998, about half a mile from where Harris was found. Forensic tests proved that she had been there for at least three months.

The last victim was 25-year-old Olivia Smith, whose date of death is uncertain. After picking her up from an apartment building at Airport Way South, Harris and Smith engaged in a violent argument about exchanging drugs for sex, after which DeWayne took out a knife and stabbed her numerous times and slashed her throat. He left the body on the scene, where it was discovered on the stairwell on January 10, 1998.

== Arrest, trial and imprisonment ==
Some time after the murders, Harris was jailed for an unrelated robbery charge. While in jail, around April 1998 he phoned a detective and told him that he could lead him to the murderer. He later was confronted and confessed to murders of three women, claiming that it was his 'hobby' and he got a thrill out of doing it. Shortly after his confession, he was charged with all three murders, and was detained at the King County jail on $5 million bail.

At his trial, Harris, strapped in a restraining chair because of his unruly behavior, was described as a cunning and manipulative predator who preyed on vulnerable women. According to his attorney, John Hicks, his only reason for confessing was that he "wanted Seattle to recognize there was a serial killer." He was found guilty of all charges in December 1998, and finally sentenced to 94 years imprisonment the next month. Upon hearing the verdict, he dropped his head backwards and started to laugh, much to the courtroom's shock. For his final words before the court, Harris told the King County Superior Court Judge Marsha Pechman that there were more like him out there, and that nobody was safe, even in their own homes and apartments. He also added that there was no true justice, as he was still living and breathing, and had certain privileges in prison. He also expressed hopes for the victims' families' forgiveness. Upon being escorted out of the room, he hurled insults at the jury which convicted him. Initially at the Clallam Bay Corrections Center, DeWayne Lee Harris is currently serving his sentence at the Stafford Creek Corrections Center (SCCC).

In an interview, Harris claimed to have committed 32 other murders.

== Popular culture ==
Dewayne Lee Harris murders and related investigation were adapted in the first episode of "Real Detective", a Canadian produced docudrama.

Harris was also featured in season one, episode two of "American Detective", a documentary series appearing on Discovery+.

Harris is interviewed on the "Unforbidden Truth" podcast dated January 26, 2021.

== See also ==
- List of serial killers in the United States
