= Look Mexico =

American rock band

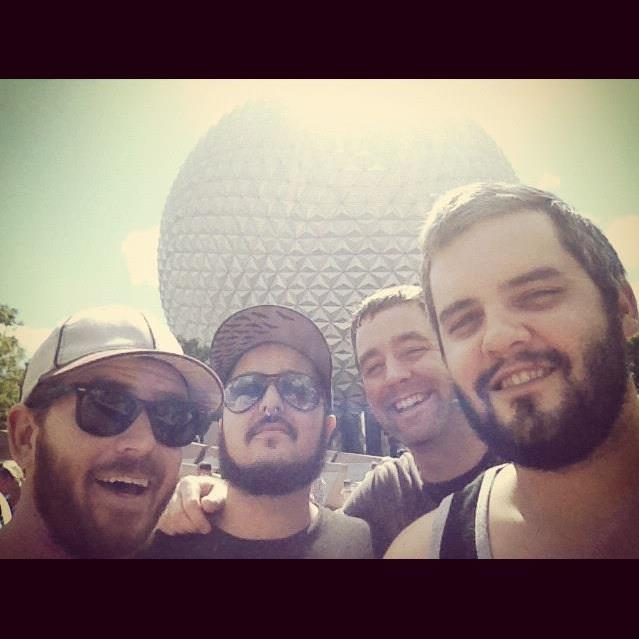
- Look Mexico (left to right): Matt Agrella, Gary Battreall, Ryan Smith, Ryan Slate

Background information
- Origin: Tallahassee, Florida, U.S.
- Genres: Indie rock; math rock; emo
- Years active: 2004–present
- Labels: Lujo; Suburban Home; Adeline; Tiny Engines
- Members: Matt Agrella; Ryan Slate; Ryan Smith; Gary Battreall; Josh Mikel
- Past members: Jared Fowler; Micah Vandegrift; Dave Bumsted; Tyson Kuhlhoff; Dave Pinkham; Alex Gooding; Nick Chambers; Benj Kirsch
- Website: https://lookmexico.bandcamp.com

Look Mexico is an American rock band from Tallahassee, Florida, United States. The band is composed of Matt Agrella, Ryan Slate, Ryan Smith, Josh Mikel and Gary Battreall. Since their inception in 2004, Look Mexico have released three full-length albums and four EPs, touring extensively in their support. All of the band's song titles are direct quotes from Vin Diesel's characters across various films.

== History ==
=== Inception ===
In the summer 2004, singer/guitarist Matt Agrella and guitarist Dave Bumsted formed Look Mexico, shortly followed by former Kids Like Us drummer Joshua Mikel. In the course of a few months, they tried out a number of bassists (Jared Fowler/Micah Vandegrift) before settling on Tyson Kuhlhoff, who remained in the band until spring of 2008. Drummer Joshua Mikel is also an actor and starred as Jared in the AMC TV show The Walking Dead in 2017.

=== So Byzantine - EP ===
The band's first EP, So Byzantine was released mid-2005 and featured Matt Agrella, Micah Vandergrift, Dave Bumsted, and Josh Mikel. The songs "Comin' in Hot With a Side of Bacon," "Me and My Dad Built Her," and "I Had a Wrench" would later be reimagined on the band's debut full length This Is Animal Music.

=== The Crucial EP ===
Released in 2006, the band's second EP featured Matt Agrella, Dave Bumsted, Josh Mikel, and Tyson Kuhlhoff. The release marked the band's first music video with the instrumental track "Guys, I Need a Helicopter." Shortly following the release guitarist Dave Bumsted departed the band and was replaced by Ryan Slate, former lead singer/ guitarist of the defunct Tallahassee act, Mosey.

=== This Is Animal Music ===
Released in July 2007 by Lujo Records the band's first full length This Is Animal Music featured Matt Agrella, Ryan Slate, Tyson Kuhlhoff, and Josh Mikel.

The record also featured accompaniment from Stambaugh Middle School band director William Agrella; Matt Agrella's father and namesake for the Stambaugh Middle William Alexander Agrella band room in Auburndale, FL.

=== Gasp Asp - EP ===
On September 1, 2008, the band released the Gasp Asp in conjunction with Lujo Records as a digital download available on iTunes. as well as Emusic The EP was released in late 2008 as a limited edition 7" by Tiny Engines.

After spending much time on the road, Look Mexico inducted Ryan Smith in 2008 to take up the bass guitar and added multi-instrumentalist Dave Pinkham to their lineup.

=== To Bed To Battle ===
After working on the album the better half of 2009, Look Mexico released To Bed To Battle on March 23, 2010 through Suburban Home Records. The album was produced by the same team seen on Gasp Asp with Phil Martin and August Hansen handling the controls and drum engineering. Upon Mikel's departure, Alex Gooding stepped in to tour in support of the LP.

The single "You Stay, I Go, No Following." was included on the video game Rock Band as part of the Rock Band Network. The song also features the guest vocal talents of U.K. singer songwriter Frank Turner.

=== Real Americans Spear It - EP ===
After relocating to Austin, TX the band recruited the talents of drummer Nick Chambers with whom they wrote their third EP Real Americans Spear It The EP was released in 2011 on Adeline Records.

=== Uniola ===
The band's third full length effort, Uniola was released on June 24, 2016. It was produced under Tiny Engines' discographic label. The album also was again produced by Phil Martin and features Matt Agrella, Ryan Slate, Ryan Smith, Benj Kirsch on keyboard, and San Antonio math rock act Jonah Vin's Gary Battreall on drums. Following recording, the band returned to Florida, reconnecting with former drummer Josh Mikel.

== Discography ==
=== Studio albums ===
- This Is Animal Music (2007)
- To Bed To Battle (2010)
- Uniola (2016)

=== EPs ===
- So Byzantine (2005)
- The Crucial EP (2006)
- Gasp Asp (2008)
- Real Americans Spear It (2011)

=== Compilations ===
- The Hang Loose Collection (2005)
- The Crucial Collection (2008)
- So Crucialtine (2012)

=== Music videos ===
- "Guys, I Need a Helicopter" from The Crucial EP
- "You Come Into My House, While I Sleep? from This Is Animal Music
- "You're Not Afraid of the Dark, Are You?" from Gasp Asp
- "You Stay. I Go. No Following." from To Bed To Battle
- "Arrest, I Don't Feel Like I'm Under Arrest from Real Americans Spear It
- "Runnin' Ain't Freedom (You Should Know That) from Real Americans Spear It
