= Stafford Creek Corrections Center =

State prison for men in Aberdeen, Washington

Stafford Creek Corrections Center (SCCC)
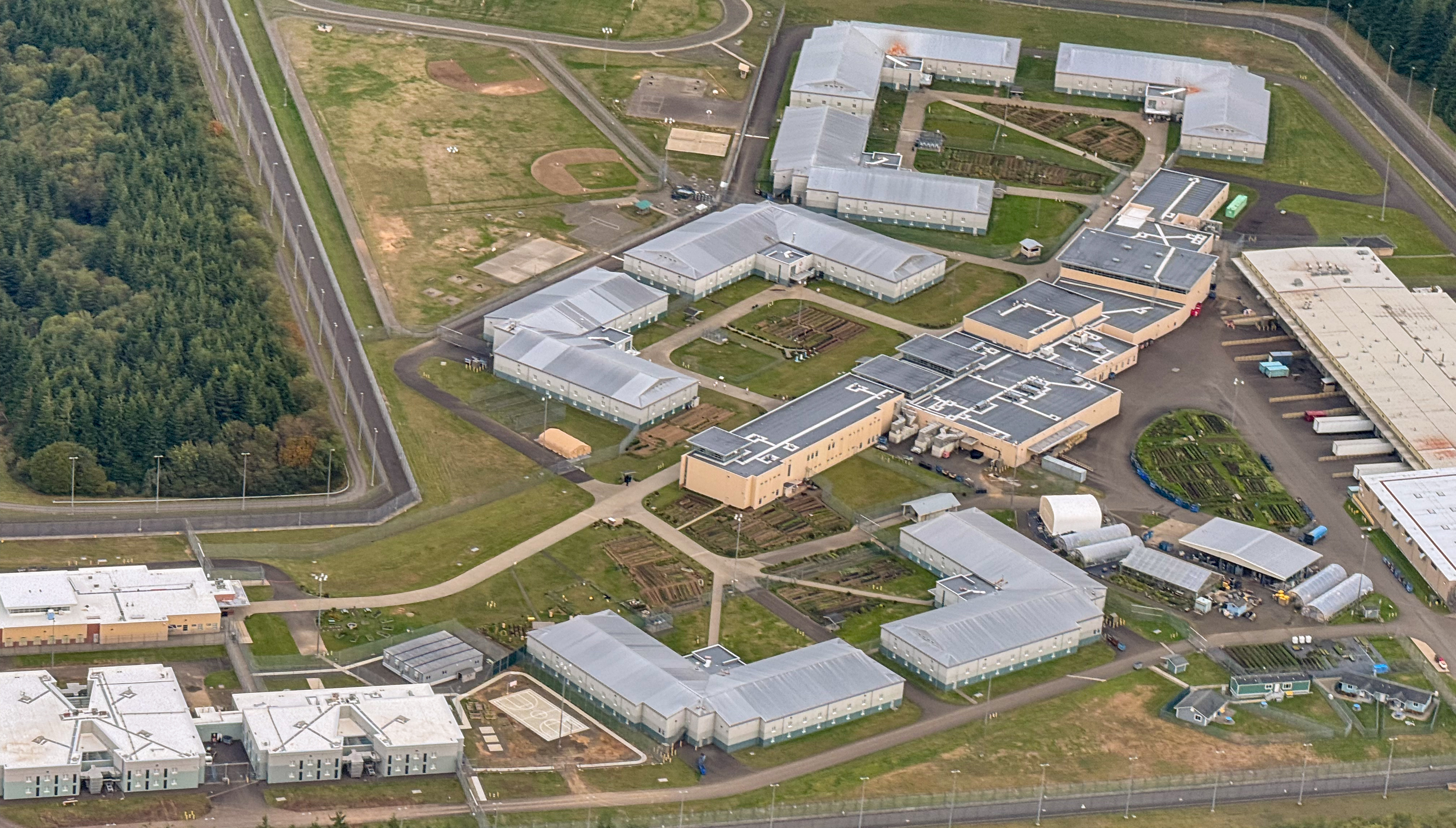
- Aerial photo of Stafford Creek Corrections Center

- Location in Washington
- Location: Aberdeen, Washington; 46°55′20″N 123°55′14″W
- Status: Operational
- Security class: Minimum, Medium, Maximum
- Capacity: 1,936
- Opened: 2000
- Managed by: Washington State Department of Corrections
- Warden: Karen Arnold
- Website: www.doc.wa.gov/corrections/incarceration/prisons/sccc.htm

Stafford Creek Corrections Center (SCCC) is a Washington State Department of Corrections state prison for men located in Aberdeen, Washington. The facility opened in 2000, has an operating capacity of 1936 inmates, and supports a mix of minimum, medium, and maximum security levels.

Stafford is one of a number of Washington prisons with an environmental program developed in conjunction with The Evergreen State College. Inmates plant gardens (though health code restrictions are still being reviewed, preventing the food from being utilized in the institution kitchen), help restore protected wetlands by raising seedlings in prison greenhouses, and similar programs. Results include an annual cost savings of $200,000 at Stafford from recycling trash, which decreased the amount of trash being hauled away

== Notable inmates ==
Inmate Name	Register Number	Status	Details
DeWayne Lee Harris	908867	Serving a 94-year sentence.	Convicted of murdering 3 women in the late 1990's.
Paul Kenneth Keller	709189	Serving a 107-year sentence.	Convicted arsonist and murderer.
Benjamin Ng	280999	Serving a life sentence.	One of the perpetrators of the 1983 Wah Mee massacre.
Allen Christopher Ivanov	396362	Serving a life sentence.	Perpetrator of the 2016 Mukilteo shooting.
Jesus Mezquia		Died in January 2021	Convicted in the 1993 murder of Mia Zapata.

== See also ==
- List of law enforcement agencies in Washington (state)
- List of United States state correction agencies
- List of U.S. state prisons
- List of Washington state prisons
