= The Dark Romantics =

Indie rock band from Lakeland, Florida

- Origin: Lakeland, Florida, United States
- Genres: Indie rock
- Years active: 2005-Present
- Labels: Lujo Records
- Members: Eric Collins: Vocals, Guitars, Keyboards; Dean Paul: Guitars, Keyboards; Carla Jones: Bass; Amanda Jones: Keys; Fifi Salomon: Drums

The Dark Romantics are an American indie rock band. Formed in Lakeland, Florida in 2005, they have been signed to Lujo Records and have released two albums and two EPs that have each been internationally distributed.

== History ==
The band was formed by brothers-in-law Eric Collins, formerly of Denison Marrs and the Party People, and Dean Paul Lorenz, who had also played in Denison Marrs, The Party People, and The John Ralston Band. After signing to Lujo Records, they enlisted their wives, sisters Carla and Amanda Jones, respectively, and drummer Fifi Salomon to round out the band. The band recorded their first album, Some Midnight Kissin', in 2006 with Jason Martin of Starflyer 59. Upon the album's release, The Dark Romantics toured with The Mooney Suzuki, Copeland, Murder By Death, New London Fire, Scissors For Lefty, and Discover America. In 2008 the Dark Romantics reentered the studio to record their second full-length album, Heartbreaker, which was released in September 2008.

== Discography ==
=== Albums ===
- Some Midnight Kissin', Lujo Records, (2007)
- Heartbreaker, Lujo Records (2008)

=== EPs ===
- Another Song EP Lujo Records, (2006)
- The Artificial Ep Lujo Records, (2007)

=== Singles ===
- Lonely/Roads 7" New Granada Records (2008)
- Let's Ride iTunes Lujo Records (2008)
