= Tim Ward (musician) =

American musician

- Ward in 2005

Background information
- Born: Timothy Christopher Ward
- Origin: Mukilteo, Washington, U.S.
- Genres: Progressive rock, post-hardcore, electronic, psychedelic, drone
- Occupation: Musician
- Instruments: Vocals, bass, guitar, keyboards
- Years active: 2002–present
- Formerly of: The Fall of Troy, Trash Kids, The 30 Years War

Timothy Christopher Ward is an American musician best known as the former bassist and co-lead vocalist for the Mukilteo, Washington, based post-hardcore band The Fall of Troy and as a singer and guitarist for the band Trash Kids.

== Early life and career ==
Ward attended Kamiak High School and graduated in 2003. He met his bandmates Andrew Forsman and Thomas Erak while there, and they began a band called The 30 Years War with another member, Mike Munro. The 30 Years War independently released two EPs. In late high school Munro left the band, and the trio decided to continue their music, calling their new group The Fall of Troy.

== The Fall of Troy ==
In May 2003, just before their high school graduation, The Fall of Troy entered the studio to record their first full-length album, which was released on Lujo Records and Equal Vision Records. He chipped a tooth during a stage diving incident in Detroit.

=== 2007 departure ===
Ward left the band during their tour with Coheed and Cambria. He was replaced by bassist and vocalist Frank Ene on November 28, 2007. Thomas Erak stated on the band's forums that his leave was full-time and for the best interest of the band. He remained in touch with his former bandmates and offered to create artwork for the bands' future albums and merchandise. However, he was not mentioned in the liner notes for The Fall of Troy's record, In the Unlikely Event.

=== 2013 return ===
In 2010, The Fall of Troy announced a hiatus. When they returned in 2013, Ward rejoined his former bandmates, and his replacement Frank Ene was no longer with the band.

== Other musical ventures ==
During his departure from The Fall of Troy, Ward relocated to Riggins, Idaho and in November 2008 began posting new demos on his MySpace page since under the moniker of Stranger Danger. He now makes music under the monikers "Cool Timmy" and "Messedupcoyote", both of which are signed to the online record label run by Father LongLegs "Woozy Tribe".

=== Trash Kids ===
He joined a band called Trash Kids which consisted of Ward and Tyler Koykas of The Parallax View. Ward writes lyrics as well as performing lead vocals, lead guitar, standup bass, slide guitar, and backup keys. Kyokas performs beats, samples, synthesizer, keys, guitar, bass, backup, vocals, and mixing. In 2012, Trash Kids released an LP, Get Lost, on Bandcamp which was available for pay-what-you-want download. Since then they have released three digital albums, Extra Trash, Headdancer, and Fade, Ghost, Fade As of 2015 they have released a new EP titled "Deader Than Ever" featuring Andrew Forsman.

== Equipment used on tour ==
Basses

- Fender Geddy Lee Jazz Bass in black
- Fender American Jazz Bass in sunburst
- Fender American Jazz Bass in red
- Gibson Grabber bass in natural finish, with slide pickup

Amplifiers

- Ampeg SVT Classic head
- Ampeg SVT-810E 8x10 bass enclosure

Effects pedals

- BOSS TU-2 Tuner
- BOSS SYB-5 Bass synthesizer pedal
- BOSS ODB-3 Overdrive

Others

- SKB PS-15 Integrated Pedalboard
