= Lujo Records =

American independent record label

- Founded: 2001
- Founder: Erik Aucoin, Jocelyn Toews Aucoin
- Distributor: Nail
- Genre: Indie rock
- Country of origin: U.S.
- Location: Ojai, California
- Official website: www.lujorecords.com

Lujo Records is an American independent record label that was founded in 2001 by Erik Aucoin in Louisiana. In 2004, Lujo Records moved to Washington, D.C., and Jocelyn Toews bought 50% of the label. In 2006 Aucoin and Toews married and in 2008 they moved the label to Palo Alto, California. Lujo has released records by The Fall of Troy, Look Mexico, The Dark Romantics, Baby Teeth, Pomegranates and more.

== Roster ==
- A Lull
- All City Affairs
- Baby Teeth
- Bluebrain
- Cool Hand Luke
- The Dark Romantics
- Death House Chaplain
- Discover America
- Enlou
- The Gena Rowlands Band
- New Brutalism
- The Out Circuit
- Roy
- Suffering and the Hideous Thieves
- The Torches
- Yourself & the Air

=== Past ===
- The Fall of Troy (Active, unsigned)
- Frantic Mantis
- Look Mexico (Active, on Adeline Records)
- Pomegranates (currently inactive)
- In Praise of Folly (Disbanded, members now play as Mt. St. Helens Vietnam Band)
- Ateriavia (disbanded, members play in A Lull)
- Mouse Fire (disbanded)
- The Evaluation (disbanded)
- History (Invades)
- Verona (inactive)

== See also ==
- List of record labels
