= Andrew Forsman =

American drummer

- Born: Andrew Clark Forsman; September 29, 1985 (age 40)
- Origin: Mukilteo, Washington
- Genres: Progressive rock, post-hardcore, mathcore, math rock
- Occupation: Musician
- Instruments: Drums, percussion
- Years active: 2002–present
- Labels: Equal Vision, Lujo

Andrew Clark Forsman is an American drummer and percussionist from Mukilteo, Washington, known as one of the founding members of the Seattle-based progressive rock band The Fall of Troy.

== Early life and youth career ==
Forsman grew up in Mukilteo, Washington and graduated from Kamiak High School in 2004. Forsman started drumming at a young age. When he was in 7th grade, his parents told him that money was tight, and he had to stop taking drum lessons. His instructor at the time, Rick Strenslan, was so confident in his student's future success that he continued to give Forsman lessons for free. In high school he joined the Kamiak Show Band drumline, where he befriended Fall of Troy member Thomas Erak. Starting in his sophomore year of high school, Forsman was involved in a band with fellow Fall of Troy members called The 30 Years War. The band independently released two EPs Martyrs Among the Casualties and Live at the Paradox. Following the release of these EPs, member Mike Munro left the band. Forsman had the idea to continue on, the remaining members forming The Fall of Troy.

== Career ==
=== The Fall of Troy ===
The Fall of Troy was formed in 2003. During their late high school years, The Fall of Troy released an album through Equal Vision Records. Forsman continued as their drummer from 2003-2010, when the band went on a hiatus. In 2013, the band came together again with Forsman as the drummer. In 2007, Forsman jokingly set a goal to have a song featured on a Guitar Hero video game. Surprisingly, their song F.C.P.R.E.M.I.X. was featured on Guitar Hero III: Legends of Rock.

=== Other groups ===
In 2010 he replaced Thomas Erak as the drummer for the band The Monday Mornings.

== Personal life ==
Forsman hoped to eventually continue his education and become a teacher, but has since decided teaching wasn't something he was interested in messing around with.

== Equipment ==
- Creation Custom drums
- Set-up: peanut with powder coated black hardware, 14x8 snare, 14x10 rack tom, 18x16 floor tom, 24x18 bass drum.
- Various cymbals, usually Zildjian Crash (left side), Zildjian Crash/Ride (right side), Zildjian Hi-Hat Top/Bottom, Zildjian Zil-Bel. Has been known to use a sabian AA ride and Paiste RUDE crash/ride.
- Yamaha hardware

Note: Andrew positions his Zildjian Zil-Bel upside-down atop his Crash/Ride. It can be heard in about half of The Fall of Troy's songs, most often in the Manipulator tracks, "A Man, A Plan, A Canal Panama" and "Problem!?"

== See also ==
- The Fall of Troy
