= Northwest Veterans Museum =

Museum in Washington, US

Coordinates: 47.8178°N 122.2776°W

Northwest Veterans Museum is a museum in Lynnwood, Washington. It opened on May 6, 2017. The museum is housed in the Wickers Building in Heritage Park, formerly the Alderwood Manor post office, which is listed on Washington State Heritage Register.
