= Alderwood =

Alderwood may refer to:

- Alderwood, Toronto, a neighbourhood within Toronto, Ontario, Canada
- Alderwood Mall, a regional shopping mall located in Lynnwood, Washington, United States
- Alderwood Manor, a CDP in Snohomish County, Washington, United States
- Alderwood, County Tyrone, a townland in County Tyrone, Northern Ireland
- Alderwood School, an all-through school in Aldershot in the UK
- Alderwood Middle School, a middle school in Lynnwood, Washington
- Marietta-Alderwood, Washington, a CDP in Whatcom County, Washington, United States

== See also ==
- Alder (disambiguation)
