= North Lynnwood, Washington =

Place in Washington, United States

- CDP
- Location within Washington (state)
- Coordinates: 47°51′12″N 122°16′35″W
- Country: United States
- State: Washington
- County: Snohomish

Area
  - Total: 8.1 km^{2} (3.12 sq mi)
- Elevation: 168 m (551 ft)

Population (2010)
  - Total: 16,574
  - Density: 2,050/km^{2} (5,310/sq mi)
- Time zone: Pacific
- Area code: 425

North Lynnwood is a census-designated place (CDP) located in Snohomish County, Washington. As of the 2020 census, North Lynnwood had a population of 22,802. It was originally part of Picnic Point-North Lynnwood. For the 2010 census, the CDP was separated into Picnic Point and North Lynnwood, with a small part going to the new Meadowdale CDP.

== Geography ==
North Lynnwood is located at coordinates 47°51'12"N 122°16'35"W. It has an area of 3.12 sq. miles.

== Demographics ==
Historical population
Census	Pop.	Note	%±
2010	16,574		—
2020	22,802		37.6%
U.S. Decennial Census; 2000 2010

North Lynnwood first appeared as a census designated place in the 2010 U.S. census formed from part of deleted Picnic Point-North Lynnwood CDP.

=== Racial and ethnic composition ===
North Lynnwood CDP, Washington – Racial and ethnic composition Note: the US Census treats Hispanic/Latino as an ethnic category. This table excludes Latinos from the racial categories and assigns them to a separate category. Hispanics/Latinos may be of any race.
Race / Ethnicity (NH = Non-Hispanic)	Pop 2010	Pop 2020	% 2010	% 2020
White alone (NH)	9,221	10,142	55.64%	44.48%
Black or African American alone (NH)	1,081	2,110	6.52%	9.25%
Native American or Alaska Native alone (NH)	111	94	0.67%	0.41%
Asian alone (NH)	3,355	5,256	20.24%	23.05%
Native Hawaiian or Pacific Islander alone (NH)	156	248	0.94%	1.09%
Other race alone (NH)	36	226	0.22%	0.99%
Mixed race or Multiracial (NH)	821	1,586	4.95%	6.96%
Hispanic or Latino (any race)	1,793	3,140	10.82%	13.77%
Total	16,574	22,802	100.00%	100.00%

=== 2020 census ===
As of the 2020 census, North Lynnwood had a population of 22,802. The median age was 33.8 years. 19.3% of residents were under the age of 18 and 9.6% of residents were 65 years of age or older. For every 100 females there were 98.7 males, and for every 100 females age 18 and over there were 95.0 males age 18 and over.

100.0% of residents lived in urban areas, while 0.0% lived in rural areas.

There were 9,313 households in North Lynnwood, of which 27.7% had children under the age of 18 living in them. Of all households, 40.0% were married-couple households, 21.5% were households with a male householder and no spouse or partner present, and 27.4% were households with a female householder and no spouse or partner present. About 27.3% of all households were made up of individuals and 6.0% had someone living alone who was 65 years of age or older.

There were 9,727 housing units, of which 4.3% were vacant. The homeowner vacancy rate was 0.8% and the rental vacancy rate was 5.3%.

Racial composition as of the 2020 census
Race	Number	Percent
White	10,672	46.8%
Black or African American	2,153	9.4%
American Indian and Alaska Native	206	0.9%
Asian	5,294	23.2%
Native Hawaiian and Other Pacific Islander	257	1.1%
Some other race	1,596	7.0%
Two or more races	2,624	11.5%

== Notable points of interest ==
- Well Number 5
