= Lynnwood Event Center =

Municipal convention center in Lynnwood, Washington

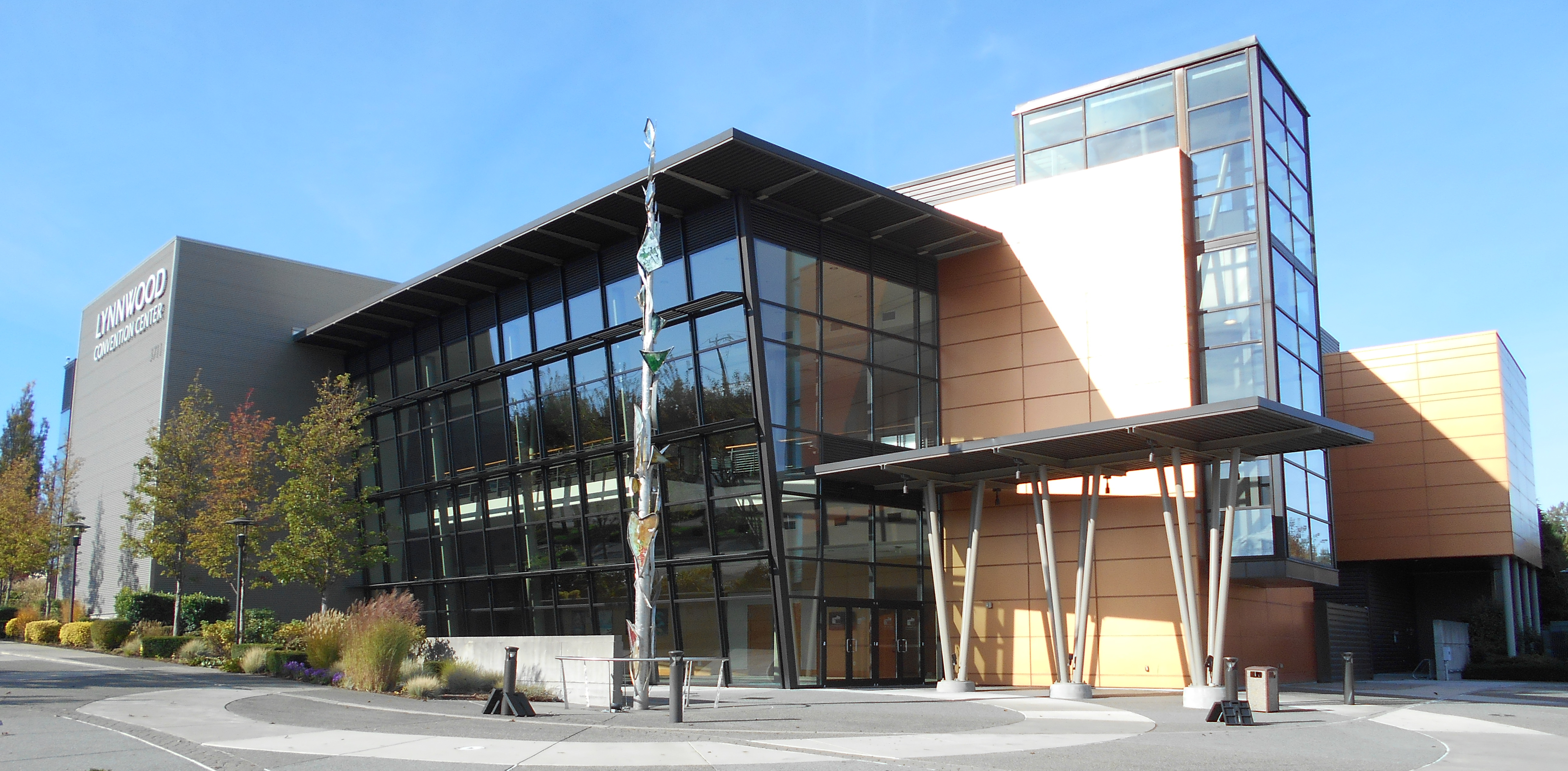
- The convention center's exterior, 2015
- Interactive map of Lynnwood Event Center
- Address: 3711 196th Street Southwest
- Location: Lynnwood, Washington, U.S.
- Coordinates: 47°49′17.4″N 122°17′01.3″W
- Owner: Lynnwood Public Facilities District

Convention use
- Total space: 53,985 sq ft (5,015.4 m^{2})

Construction
- Built: 2004–2005
- Opened: April 30, 2005
- Cost: $31 million

Website
- lynnwoodeventcenter.com

The Lynnwood Event Center is a suburban convention center located in Lynnwood, Washington, near Seattle. The $31 million facility opened in 2005 and is managed by the Lynnwood Public Facilities District. The convention center was first proposed in the 1980s, but was rejected by voters on three occasions; the formation of a public facilities district in 1999 funded its construction.

== History ==
Lynnwood, historically a bedroom community of Seattle and nearby Everett, began pursuing a convention center and performing arts venue in the late 1960s. Boosters from the Edmonds Community College attempted to lure a state-sponsored "festival center" in 1977, but failed to garner support over a site near Federal Way. A 3,000-seat arts-and-convention center on the college campus was also proposed in 1980, but failed to receive funds from the Washington State Legislature. In the November 1982 election, voters in south Snohomish County (including Lynnwood and nearby cities) rejected the formation of a special district to develop the arts-and-convention center, and also repealed a local sales tax, planned to be used to fund its construction. The boosters later decided against scheduling another public vote on the arts-and-convention center, and ultimately decided in 1985 to split the projects into two: a performing arts center on the college campus, and a convention center elsewhere in Lynnwood. A ballot measure was attempted again in 1988, but failed because of low voter turnout.

In 1995-96 The South Snohomish County Chamber of Commerce, representing over 800 businesses in the county, conducted a feasibility study to build a convention center. Several sight locations were viewed such as the Holiday Inn location on 128th in Everett and the Chevron gas station on the corner of 44th & 200th St. in Lynnwood. The Chamber of Commerce was instrumental in laying the ground work for the future convention center.

A second, major campaign to build an 800-seat, $45 million arts-and-convention center in Lynnwood began in 1998. The proposal was sent to local voters in May 1998, with mixed support from politicians, and was rejected by 75 percent. In 1999, the city government established a public facilities district, a type of local special district that would be able to fund a convention center using a state sales tax rebate. It was the first of its kind in Washington after the state legislature allowed sales tax rebates to be used for public facility districts. The estimated cost of the 80,000-square-foot (7,400 m^{2}) convention center led the city to reconsider its plans in 2000, instead opting for a smaller, 35,000-square-foot (3,300 m^{2}) facility costing $32 million. The final design for the convention center, with 55,000 square feet (5,100 m^{2}) of total meeting space, was unveiled to the public in November 2002. The convention center was funded by $27.9 million in issued bonds, as well as rebate sales taxes from the state government and hotel-motel taxes collected by the county and city.

Construction on the convention center began in October 2003. Howard S. Wright Companies was selected to build the facility, while SMG was awarded the rights to operate it. The convention center opened on April 30, 2005, and immediately came into competition with the Everett Events Center (now Xfinity Arena) in downtown Everett. After completion of the convention center, the Lynnwood Public Facilities District attempted to build a 200-room Hilton Garden Inn hotel on an adjacent property. The proposed hotel was scrapped in 2008 after the main developer withdrew from negotiations due to the 2008 financial crisis; by then, the convention center had an annual attendance of 82,000 people. A 155-room hotel was eventually built on the property a decade later under a different developer in conjunction with an eight-story apartment building.

In its first decade in operation, the Lynnwood Convention Center hosted over 3,900 events and a total attendance of 753,000 people. An estimated $24.8 million in economic impact was generated by the convention center in 2014. The facility was renamed the Lynnwood Event Center in 2022 as part of plans to develop an entertainment district in the surrounding area. The strip mall that surrounds the event center, which includes Lynnwood's post office, was acquired by the public facilities district in 2022. A 15-year master plan for the area, named "The District", was announced in 2025; it comprises a 412-room hotel, a parking garage, two residential buildings, and a public plaza.

== Facilities ==
The Lynnwood Event Center is located on 196th Street Southwest, a block west of Interstate 5 in central Lynnwood. It is southwest of the Alderwood Mall, and within the city's planned city center.

The convention center has a total floor space of 53,985 square feet (5,015.4 m^{2}), and a grand hall that can accommodate 1,200 people. The facility has been managed by Oak View Group since 2022.
