= Washington State Route 524 =

State highway in Snohomish County, Washington, US

State Route 524

- SR 524 highlighted in red.

Route information
- Auxiliary route of I-5
- Maintained by WSDOT
- Length: 14.68 mi (23.63 km)
- Existed: 1964–present

Major junctions
- West end: SR 104 in Edmonds
- SR 99 in Lynnwood; I-5 in Lynnwood; SR 527 in Bothell; SR 9 near Maltby
- East end: SR 522 in Maltby

Location
- Country: United States
- State: Washington
- Counties: Snohomish

Highway system
- State highways in Washington; Interstate; US; State; Scenic; Pre-1964; 1964 renumbering; Former
| ← SR 523 | → SR 525 |

State Route 524 (SR 524) is a suburban state highway in the U.S. state of Washington, located entirely within Snohomish County. It begins at SR 104 in Edmonds and travels east past SR 99, Interstate 5 (I-5), under I-405, past SR 527 and SR 9 to end at SR 522 in Maltby. The road also has two spur routes, one connecting to SR 104 in Edmonds and another connecting to I-5 in Lynnwood.

First appearing on a map in 1895, the highway was designated as part of Secondary State Highway 1W (SSH 1W) in 1957 during an extension from Edmonds to Lynnwood. SSH 1W was extended further to SSH 2J (present-day SR 527) in 1959 before becoming SR 524 in 1964. A final extension east to SR 522 was completed in 1991.

== Route description ==
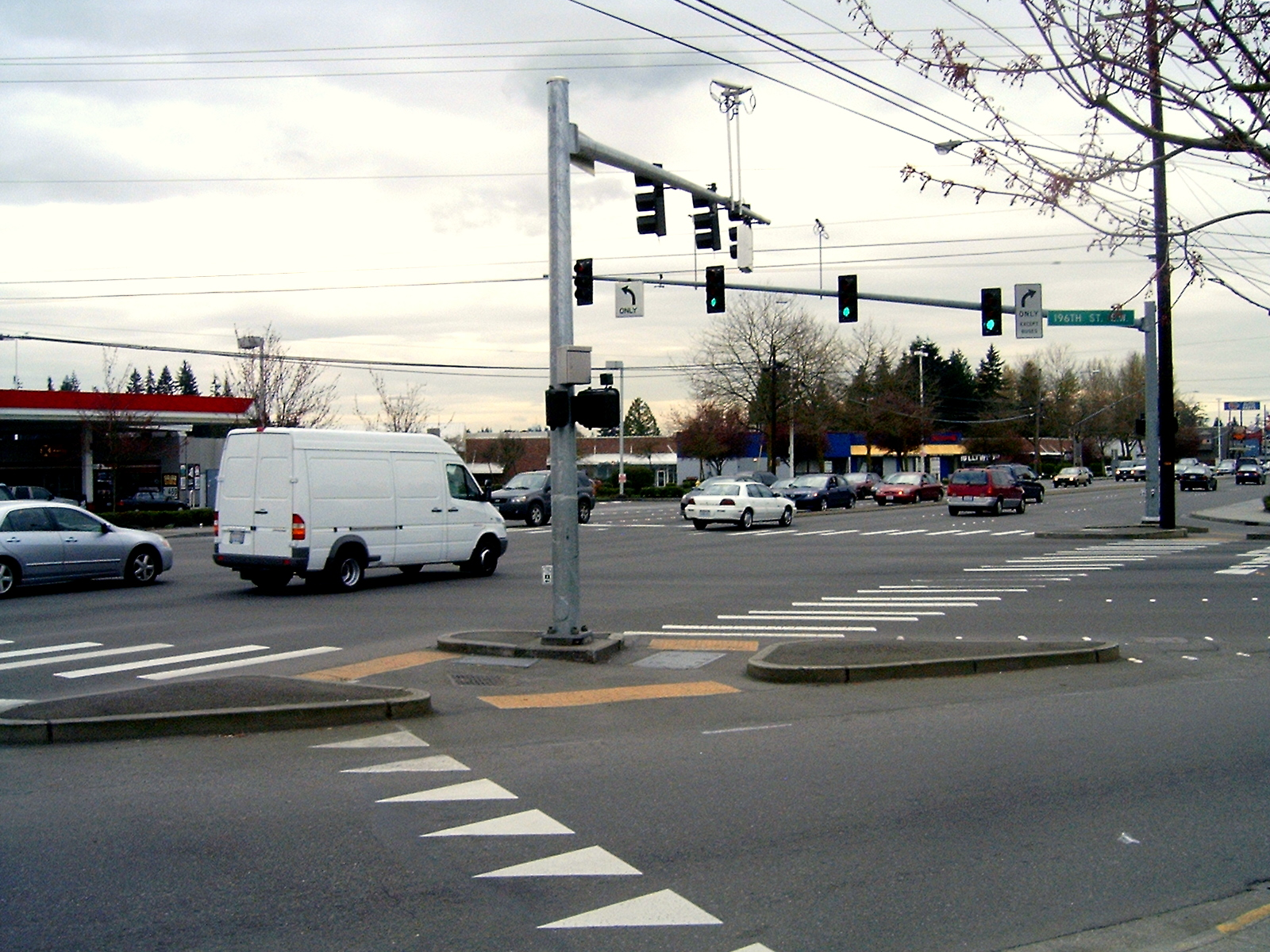
The intersection of SR 99 and SR 524 in Lynnwood.

SR 524 begins near the east end of the Edmonds ferry terminal at an intersection with SR 104 (Sunset Avenue), which continues west onto the Kingston ferry. The junction is at the head of the ferry terminal's queuing lanes and is northeast of the city's train station. From the intersection, SR 524 travels southeast on Main Street for two blocks and turns north onto 3rd Avenue, away from the center of downtown Edmonds. A spur route travels south on 3rd Avenue towards the ferry terminal's queuing lanes. The highway continues northeast through the primarily residential neighborhood west of Shell Creek and passes the Edmonds Center For the Arts. It then turns east onto Caspers Street, which crosses the creek and turns north onto 9th Avenue and east onto Puget Drive. Puget Drive continues through the center of Maplewood Park and becomes 196th Street Southwest, widening into an urban arterial street near Perrinville.

196th Street crosses into Lynnwood at 76th Avenue and passes to the north of a municipal golf course and the Edmonds College campus. SR 524 intersects SR 99 at the center of Lynnwood, surrounded by several strip malls and retailers. The highway continues east, with a brief bend to the north around Scriber Lake, and intersects another spur route at 44th Avenue West to the south of Lynnwood's civic center complex. The spur route travels south to Lynnwood City Center station and an interchange with I-5. SR 524 continues east through Lynnwood's city center and intersects I-5 with a partial cloverleaf interchange near the Lynnwood Convention Center and Alderwood Mall.

East of the interchange, SR 524 passes a few more blocks of big-box stores and a light industrial cluster before making a J-turn onto Filbert Road in the Swamp Creek canyon. The highway crosses under I-405 and over the creek in Alderwood Manor, at the bottom of Lynnwood's main hill. It follows I-405 through the North Creek area, traveling southeast until it reaches 208th Street Southeast in Bothell. SR 524 then intersects SR 527 at Thrashers Corner and climbs a hill on Maltby Road, which it follows as the suburban subdivisions give way to rural Snohomish County. The highway descends from the hill and intersects SR 9 at Turner Corner before continuing due east into the Maltby industrial area. SR 524 travels along the north side of the industrial park and crosses a set of railroad tracks before it turns south onto Yew Way and east onto Paradise Lake Road. The highway terminates at an at-grade intersection with SR 522, which continues southwest towards Woodinville as a freeway and northeast towards Monroe as a two-lane expressway.

SR 524 is primarily maintained by the Washington State Department of Transportation (WSDOT), which conducts an annual survey of state routes to measure traffic volume in terms of annual average daily traffic. Average traffic volumes on the highway range from a minimum of 3,300 vehicles at its western terminus in Edmonds to a maximum of 34,000 vehicles at its interchange with I-5 in Lynnwood. The Edmonds–Lynnwood section of SR 524 and both of its spur routes are designated as MAP-21 arterial routes under the National Highway System, a network of roads identified as important to the national economy, defense, and mobility.

== History ==
The first segment of SR 524 to appear on a map was the Edmonds–Scriber Lake section, which was on an 1895 map of the area. It later became part of the North Trunk Road, which connected Everett to Seattle in the 1920s. In 1937, a road extending from Primary State Highway 1 (PSH 1) the Snohomish–King county line to Edmonds was designated Secondary State Highway 1W (SSH 1W) in 1937, during the creation of the Primary and secondary state highways.

Edmonds and Lynnwood boosters sought a state designation for the Edmonds–Lynnwood highway in the early 1950s, citing its use by ferry travelers. SSH 1W was extended east to PSH 1 in Lynnwood by the state legislature in 1957. The designation was extended further east to SSH 2J near Bothell in 1959, provided that a new road was built in the corridor by the state. During the 1964 highway renumbering, PSH 1 became Interstate 5 (I-5), SSH 1W became SR 104 and SR 524 and SSH 2J became SR 527. SR 524 was further extended to SR 522 in 1991 as part of new standards for state highway control that were proposed in the late 1980s.

WSDOT installed a pair of roundabouts on both sides of the I-405 underpass in 2018 to handle increasing commuter traffic, with further unfunded plans to widen the roadway. In 2005, the Lynnwood city government began planning to widen a one-mile (1.6 km) section of 196th Street Southwest between SR 99 and I-5 to accommodate a business access and transit lane that would cost $50 million. Construction began in 2020 and was completed in August 2023, bringing the street to seven lanes and adding a median with turn restrictions. The city government also plans to build a six-lane overpass that connects Poplar Way with 33rd Avenue West across I-5, providing access between Alderwood Mall Boulevard and 196th Street Southwest. The project received a $25 million federal grant in 2022 and is intended to address congestion issues at the SR 524 interchange with I-5.

== Spur routes ==
=== Edmonds spur ===
State Route 524 Spur
- Location: Edmonds
- Length: 0.50 mi (800 m)

State Route 524 Spur is a 0.70-mile (1.13 km) spur route in Edmonds, Washington, that connects its parent State Route 524 in the north with State Route 104 in the south. SR 524 Spur begins at SR 524 shortly after its western terminus and travels south as 3rd Avenue and west as Pine Street to SR 104 north of Woodway city limits.

In the 1970s, after SR 524 and SR 104 already had their routing through Edmonds in place, the Washington State Ferries moved the toll booth and holding area for the Edmonds ferry terminal off the pier and along SR 104. This made the ferry terminal inaccessible from westbound SR 524. Thus, a spur route was signed south along Third Avenue and Pine Street to connect with SR 104 and the ferry terminal.

=== Lynnwood spur ===
State Route 524 Spur
- Location: Lynnwood
- Length: 0.70 mi (1,130 m)

The Lynnwood spur begins at SR 524 and goes south 0.50 miles (0.80 km) to an interchange with Interstate 5 (I-5); the highway was established between 1964 and 1970.

When SR 524 was originally extended to I-5, its interchange was only on the west side of the freeway. To accommodate traffic going in all directions, an interchange on 44th Ave W was built. 44th then became recognized as a spur of 524 (even though it's not posted anywhere along the road). Although the spur is no longer needed to make SR 524's interchange with I-5 complete, it remains signed.

== Major intersections ==
The entire route is in Snohomish County.

| Location | mi | km | Destinations | Notes |
|---|---|---|---|---|
| Edmonds | 0.00 | 0.00 | SR 104 (Sunset Avenue) to I-5 – Kingston, Everett, Seattle | |
| Edmonds | 0.12 | 0.19 | SR 524 Spur south (Third Avenue) to SR 104 – Kingston Ferry | |
| Lynnwood | 3.69 | 5.94 | SR 99 | |
| Lynnwood | 4.76 | 7.66 | SR 524 Spur south (44th Avenue West) to I-5 south | |
| Lynnwood | 5.41 | 8.71 | I-5 – Seattle, Everett | |
| Bothell | 9.62 | 15.48 | SR 527 (Bothell–Everett Highway) – Mill Creek, Bothell | |
| | 12.96 | 20.86 | SR 9 – Snohomish | |
| Maltby | 14.68 | 23.63 | SR 522 – Monroe, Bothell | |
1.000 mi = 1.609 km; 1.000 km = 0.621 mi
