= Picnic Point =

Picnic Point may refer to:

- Picnic Point, New South Wales, a suburb in Australia
- Picnic Point, Toowoomba, a park and lookout in Queensland, Australia
- Picnic Point-North Lynnwood, Washington, United States
