= Zumiez =

American clothing retailer

Zumiez Inc.
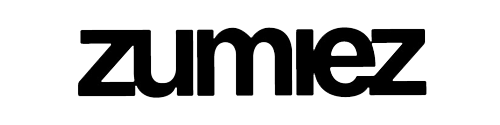

- Zumiez located inside West Town Mall Knoxville, Tennessee
- Type: Public
- Traded as: Nasdaq: ZUMZ
- Industry: Clothing
- Founded: 1978; 48 years ago
- Founders: Thomas D. Campion; Gary Haakenson
- Headquarters: Lynnwood, Washington, U.S.
- Number of locations: 604 U.S., 739 worldwide (2021)
- Area served: Worldwide
- Key people: Thomas D. Campion (Chairman of the Directors); Richard M. Brooks Jr. (President & CEO)
- Products: Clothing; Jewelry
- Revenue: US$991 million (2020)
- Operating income: ▲$138 million (2020)
- Net income: ▲$76 million (2020)
- Total assets: ▲$998 million (2020)
- Total equity: ▲$553 million (2020)
- Number of employees: 8,800 (2020)
- Website: www.zumiez.com

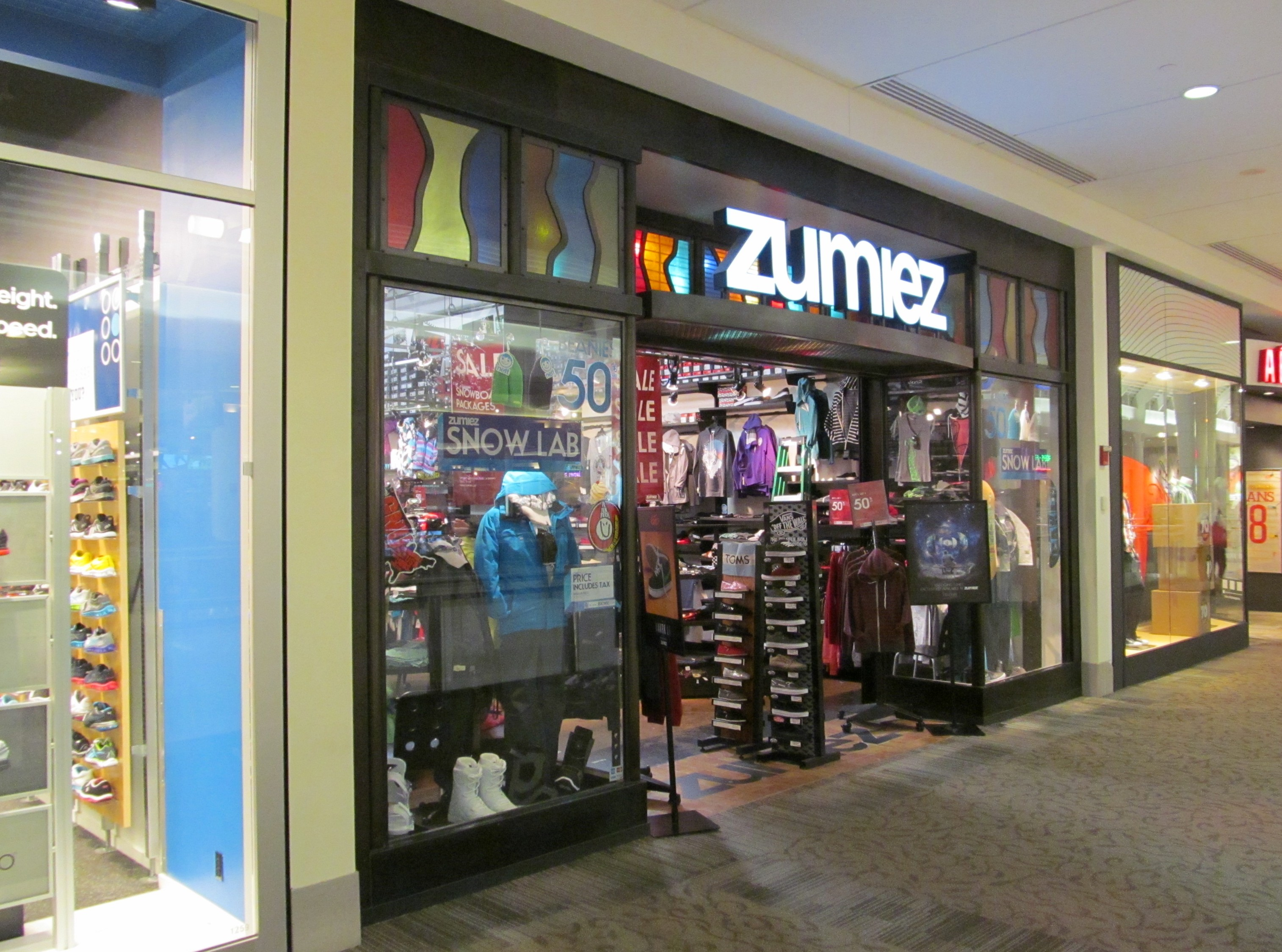
Zumiez at South Shore Plaza in Braintree, Massachusetts

Zumiez Inc. (/ˈzuːmiz/) is an American multinational specialty clothing store founded by Thomas Campion and Gary Haakenson in 1978, and publicly traded since 2005. The company is a specialty retailer of apparel, footwear, accessories and hardgoods for young men and women. Zumiez markets clothing for action sports, particularly skateboarding, snowboarding, and motocross. Zumiez is based in Lynnwood, Washington. The current president and CEO is Richard Brooks.

Originally named "Above the Belt" when the first store was opened at Northgate Mall in 1978, the company grew quickly through the early 1980s with the addition of stores at Everett Mall, Tacoma Mall, Alderwood Mall, and Bellevue Square. The mid and late 1980s brought new stores online outside of the Puget Sound area, and the corporate name changed to Zumiez. The corporate office moved from Everett to Lynnwood, Washington in 2012.

== Stores ==
As of February 3, 2018, Zumiez operates 726 stores; 608 in the United States, 52 in Canada, 54 in Europe and 12 in Australia. Zumiez is a leading retailer for lifestyle brands, centering on action sports such as skateboarding, snowboarding, BMX, and motocross.

== Couch Tour ==
For 13 years, Zumiez traveled to 12 "full stops" as part of its annual Couch Tour. Entertainment included live bands, professional skateboarding demos, and a competition featuring local amateurs. The stops usually took place at the mall where local Zumiez stores are located. Entry to the event was always free.

As part of the Couch tour, since Zumiez doesn't sponsor riders themselves, they joined up with major players in the skate industry to offer an opportunity where amateur skaters can enter and compete. 2013 sponsors included Bones Bearings, Paramore, Beyonce, Adidas, Deathwish, DGK, Neff, Oakley, and Loser Machine providing the "trophies" for each stop of the contest's winners.

== Zumiez Foundation ==
Zumiez began a charitable foundation in 2002, donating clothing to those in need in over 20 states in the United States. In 2012 over 180,000 items were donated to more than 180 organizations around the nation.

== Acquisitions ==
The company purchased the clothing company Fast Forward in 2006, Blue Tomato in 2012, and Fast Times in 2015.

== Store shooting ==
On January 25, 2014, a gunman, identified as 19-year-old Darion Marcus Aguilar, opened fire with a 12 gauge shotgun inside of Zumiez at The Mall in Columbia located in Columbia, Maryland, killing two store employees before taking his own life, according to police. Five other people were injured during the incident. Extra ammunition and crude explosives (all of which were later defused) were found in Aguilar's backpack.
