= Blue Tomato =

Austrian retail company

Blue Tomato GmbH
- Type: Subsidiary
- Industry: Retail
- Founded: 1988
- Founder: Gerfried Schuller
- Headquarters: Schladming, Austria
- Number of locations: 80+ stores
- Area served: Europe
- Key people: Adam Ellis (CEO)
- Number of employees: 850 (2025)
- Parent: Zumiez Inc. (since 2012)
- Website: www.blue-tomato.com

Blue Tomato GmbH is an Austrian retail company specialising in boardsports equipment, streetwear, and lifestyle apparel. The company was founded in 1988 by Gerfried Schuller in Schladming, Austria. Since 2012, Blue Tomato has been a subsidiary of the U.S.-based retailer Zumiez Inc.

== History ==
Blue Tomato was founded in 1988 by Austrian snowboarder Gerfried Schuller, who won the European Snowboard Championship in 1988. Before founding the company, Schuller was active in competitive snowboarding and contributed to the development of the sport in Austria. He originally established Blue Tomato as a snowboard school in Schladming.

In the early 1990s, Schuller began selling snowboard equipment informally under the name "Gerry’s Garage". In 1994, the company opened its first permanent retail store in Schladming. During the late 1990s, Blue Tomato developed an online presence and launched its official webshop in 1999.

In 2012, Blue Tomato was acquired by the American action-sports retailer Zumiez. Following the acquisition, the company continued to operate as part of the Zumiez group and functions as its European retail arm while expanding its store network across Europe.

In 2017, founder Gerfried Schuller stepped down from operational management, and Adam Ellis became chief executive officer.

In 2019, Blue Tomato received the Anton Award in the multichannel category. In 2025, the company ranked third in the "Sport Retailer of the Year" category at the #VICTOR Awards.

During the 2020s, the company continued expanding its retail presence into additional European markets, including Sweden, Italy, and Belgium.

== Operations ==
Blue Tomato operates as a multi-channel retailer combining brick-and-mortar stores with an international e-commerce platform. Blue Tomato operates over 80 retail stores across Europe, including locations in Austria, Germany, Switzerland, the Netherlands, Finland, Norway, Sweden, Italy, and Belgium, while maintaining a global online store. Its headquarters are in Schladming, Austria, with additional operational and administrative functions located in Graz and Vienna.
