= Scriber Lake Park =

Park in Lynnwood, Washington, US

Coordinates: 47°49′13″N 122°18′24″W

Scriber Lake Park is a 22-acre community park and nature refuge in Lynnwood, Washington. Scriber Lake is completely located in the park.

The lake was named after Peter Schriber, an early settler.
