= Lynnwood, Washington =

City in Washington, United States

Lynnwood
- City
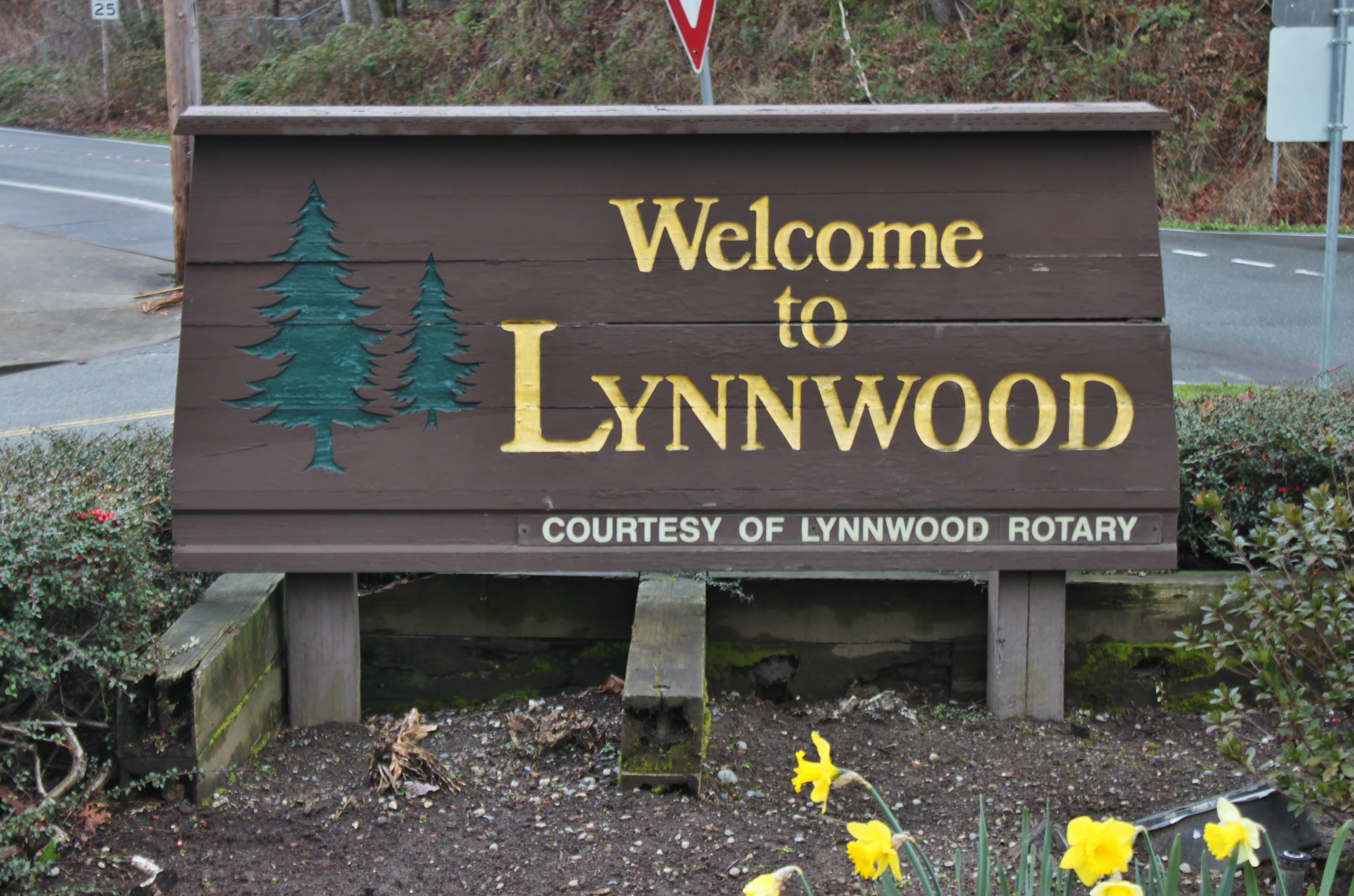

- Logo
- Interactive map of Lynnwood
- Coordinates: 47°49′16″N 122°18′54″W
- Country: United States
- State: Washington
- County: Snohomish
- Incorporated: April 23, 1959

Government
  - Type: Mayor–council
  - Mayor: George Hurst

Area
  - Total: 7.89 sq mi (20.44 km^{2})
  - Land: 7.88 sq mi (20.40 km^{2})
  - Water: 0.015 sq mi (0.04 km^{2})
- Elevation: 390 ft (120 m)

Population (2020)
  - Total: 38,568
  - Estimate (2024): 41,597
  - Density: 5,143.5/sq mi (1,985.91/km^{2})
- Time zone: UTC-8 (PST)
  - Summer (DST): UTC-7 (PDT)
- ZIP codes: 98026, 98036, 98037, 98046, 98087
- Area code: 425
- FIPS code: 53-40840
- GNIS feature ID: 1512414
- Website: lynnwoodwa.gov

Lynnwood is a city in Snohomish County, Washington, United States. The city is part of the Seattle metropolitan area and is located 16 miles (26 km) north of Seattle and 13 miles (21 km) south of Everett, near the junction of Interstate 5 and Interstate 405. It is the fourth-largest city in Snohomish County, with a population of 38,568 in the 2020 U.S. census.

Often characterized as a suburb or bedroom community, Lynnwood has the highest concentration of retailers in the region and a growing core of businesses, anchored by the Alderwood Mall. The city also has a community college, a convention center, and a major transit center. It is headquarters for several companies, including retailer Zumiez.

The Lynnwood area was logged and settled by homesteaders in the late 19th century and early 20th century, including the development of Alderwood Manor as a planned farming community. Lynnwood, named for the wife of a realtor, emerged in the late 1940s around the intersection of Highway 99 and 196th Street Southwest. The city was incorporated on April 23, 1959, and grew into a suburban hub in the years following the completion of Interstate 5 and Interstate 405. Alderwood Mall opened in 1979 and spurred the transformation of eastern Lynnwood into a retail and office district.

== History ==
Prior to contact with American settlers, the Snohomish tribe of Native Americans used the area of modern-day Lynnwood for summertime activities, including hunting, fishing, berry gathering and root cultivation. The Snohomish were relocated to the Tulalip reservation, near modern-day Marysville, after the signing of the Treaty of Point Elliott in 1855, opening the area for American settlement.

Brown's Bay, part of Puget Sound, and modern-day Meadowdale were surveyed by American loggers in 1859. Logging on Brown's Bay began in 1860, and the first American settlers arrived in the 1880s. Scottish-born stonemason Duncan Hunter became the area's first white resident in 1889, filing an 80-acre (32 ha) land claim on modern-day 36th Avenue West after moving west from Wisconsin. The claim was inherited by Hunter's son Basil, who lived on the property until his death in 1982; it was later turned into the city's Pioneer Park in the late 1980s. Hunter was joined to the east by a claim from William Morrice, a fellow stonemason from Aberdeen, Scotland. Settlers from Pennsylvania homesteaded along Cedar Valley, to the south of Hunter and Morrice, and near Scriber Lake (named for Peter Schreiber) in 1888, leading to the establishment of the area's first schoolhouse in 1895.

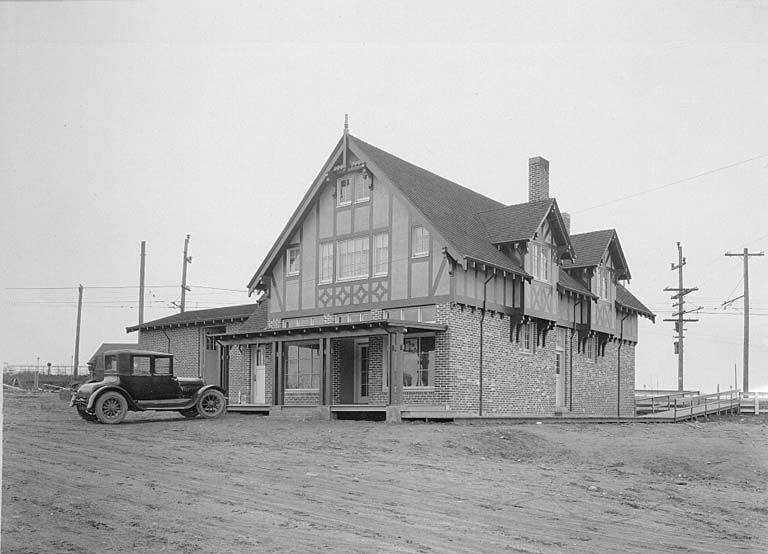
The Wickers Building, a cottage built in Alderwood Manor, pictured c. 1925

During the early 20th century, the Lynnwood area was gradually logged by private companies and mill operators, leaving behind plots with tree stumps. The arrival of the Seattle–Everett Interurban Railway in 1910 brought reliable transportation to the area, as well as real estate speculators. The Puget Mill Company, then the largest landowner in southern Snohomish County, established the planned community of "Alderwood Manor" in 1917 and marketed the area to urban dwellers wishing to build farms in the countryside. Alderwood Manor, located near an Interurban station, gained streets named for tree species and was divided into 5-to-10-acre (2.0 to 4.0 ha) plots that sold for $200 per acre. A 30-acre (12 ha) "demonstration farm" was built to educate new residents on raising crops and chickens, as well as market the Alderwood Manor plots to "Little Landers", a nickname for the new residents. Alderwood Manor grew to over 1,463 people and 200,000 hens by 1922, and had electricity and telephone services to most of its residents.

The Puget Mill Company leased out its demonstration farm in 1933 and ceased operations at Alderwood Manor later in the decade, amid declining sales during the Great Depression. At the same time, the opening of the Pacific Highway (modern-day Highway 99) in 1927 and the decline of Interurban service in the 1930s shifted the center of economic growth west near Scriber Lake. Seattle realtor Karl O'Beirn filed a plat along Highway 99 at 196th Street Southwest in 1937, naming the development "Lynnwood" after his wife Lynn. Nearby businesses adopted the name during the 1940s, leading to the formal use of "Lynnwood" by the chamber of commerce in 1946, instead of the suggested "West Alderwood".

Lynnwood gained its first post office in 1948, after a successful lobbying campaign by the Lynnwood Commercial Club to the federal Post Office Department. Throughout the early 1950s, Lynnwood saw slow residential development, in part because of the lack of sewers and other municipal services. Local residents sought to be annexed into Edmonds, but were denied and left to organize their own city. In 1956, a committee to study incorporating Lynnwood as a city was formed, proposing an area of 6.7 square miles (17 km^{2}) and population of 10,744 for the new city. A petition to incorporate was signed by 600 voters and submitted early the following year, proposing a 6-square-mile (16 km^{2}) city; during the early months of 1958, several property owners asked to be removed from the proposal over disinterest in the Lynnwood group. An incorporation measure was put before voters on the November 1958, failing by a narrow margin of 890 to 848 votes.

A second attempt at incorporation, with a revised size of three square miles (7.8 km^{2}) and population of 6,000, was approved by a 2-to-1 margin on April 14, 1959. The successful incorporation was credited in part to the movement of dilapidated homes and structures from the right of way of Interstate 5, a freeway to be built through Alderwood Manor, into the Lynnwood area at the behest of the county government. Realtor Jack Bennett was elected the city's first mayor, and the city council first met on April 20. The city charter was approved by the county commissioners on April 23, 1959, marking Lynnwood's official incorporation as a third-class city. Two years after incorporation, the young city was mired in a legal dispute with neighboring Edmonds over the annexation of the Browns Bay area, which was resolved in an out-of-court settlement.

Lynnwood began offering municipal services in its first years, opening a sewage treatment plant, a public park, new streets, and acquiring a water system from the Alderwood Water District. The city began building its 18-acre (7.3 ha) civic center complex in 1969, shortly after the approval of a bond issue to finance the $1.5 million project (equivalent to $9.81 million in 2024 dollars). The civic center, located at 44th Avenue West and 194th Street Southwest, came after a decade in leased facilities scattered around the city center. The first buildings on the campus, including the city hall and public library, opened in 1971. Later expansions to the civic center added a police station, a municipal courthouse, and an indoor recreation center.

The opening of Interstate 5 in 1965 moved the commercial center of Lynnwood east towards Alderwood Manor, which culminated in the proposed construction of a large shopping center in 1968. The 130-acre (53 ha) shopping center, named Alderwood Mall and developed by Allied Stores, was put on hold during the local recession of the early 1970s and was later sold to shopping mall developer Edward J. DeBartolo Sr. in 1976. Alderwood Mall opened on October 4, 1979, sparking a major retail and residential boom in the Lynnwood area in the early 1980s. The Swamp Creek Interchange at Interstate 5 and Interstate 405 was completed in 1984, creating a new regional connection to Alderwood and Lynnwood from the Eastside region of King County.

During the 1980s, Lynnwood gained its first of several office parks, housing high-tech companies expanding from the Eastside and the Canyon Park area of Bothell. Shopping areas developed around Alderwood Mall at the same time, creating the county's largest retail center, and new housing areas spread out from the city limits of Lynnwood. Despite the development boom of unincorporated areas surrounding Lynnwood, growth within the city itself slowed in the late 1980s and 1990s, attributed to few annexations and slow natural growth.

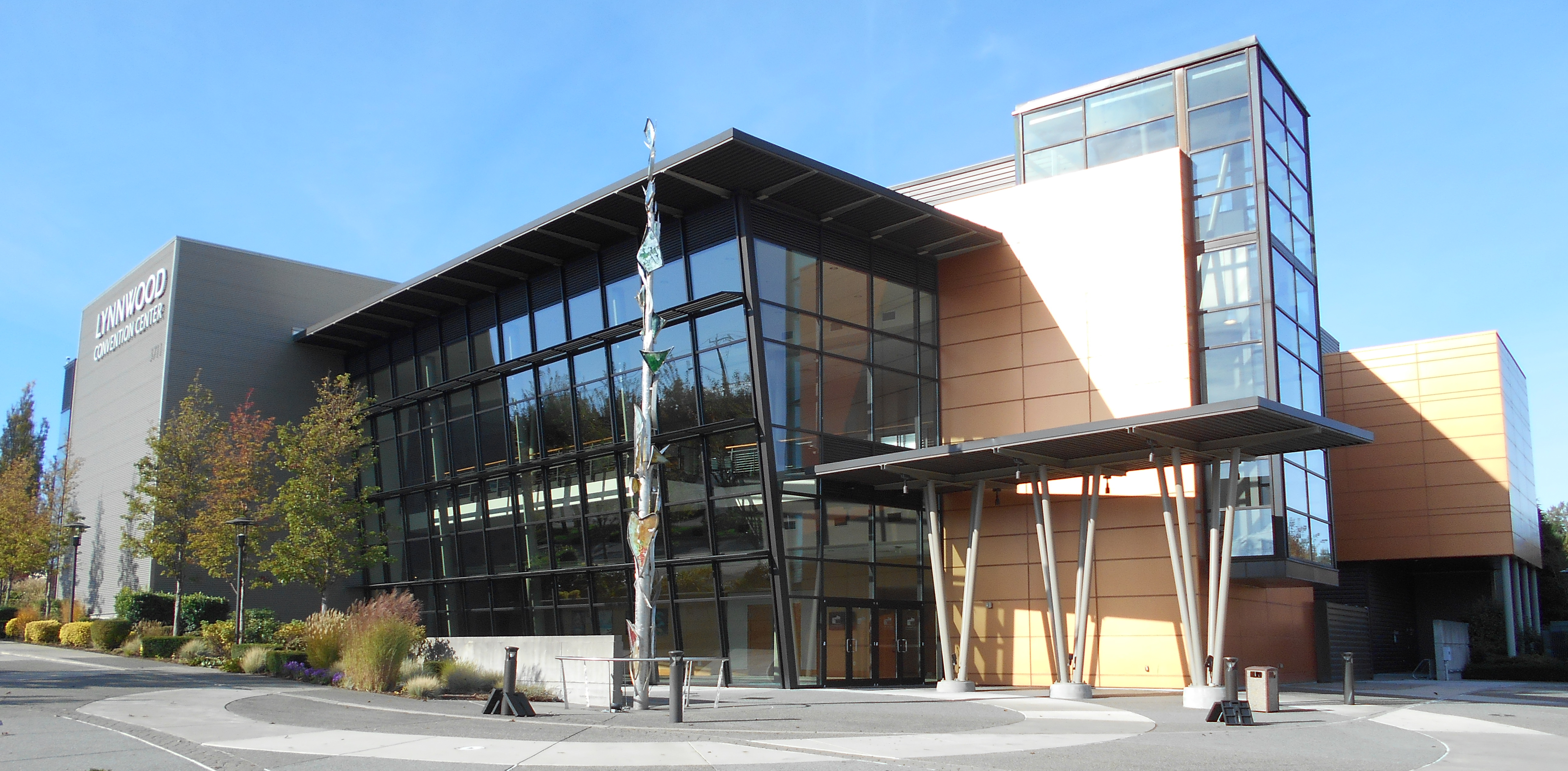
The Lynnwood Convention Center, opened in 2003 at the intersection of 196th Street Southwest and Interstate 5

Lynnwood began developing plans for a "city center" near the Alderwood Mall area in the 1980s. Like other post-war suburbs, Lynnwood developed without a defined central business district and sought to consolidate cultural facilities and high-density development in a manner similar to Downtown Bellevue. In the late 1990s, the Washington State Department of Transportation rebuilt several interchanges on Interstate 5 in Lynnwood, including the construction of a full diamond interchange at 196th Street Southwest costing $80 million. The city opened a $31 million, medium-sized convention center in 2005 to anchor the future city center. The City of Lynnwood formally adopted its City Center Subarea Plan in 2007, outlining plans to re-develop a 300-acre (120 ha) area between Lynnwood Transit Center and Alderwood Mall into a central business district. Development of the city center began in 2015, with the construction of two apartment buildings and a hotel located near the convention center.

== Geography ==
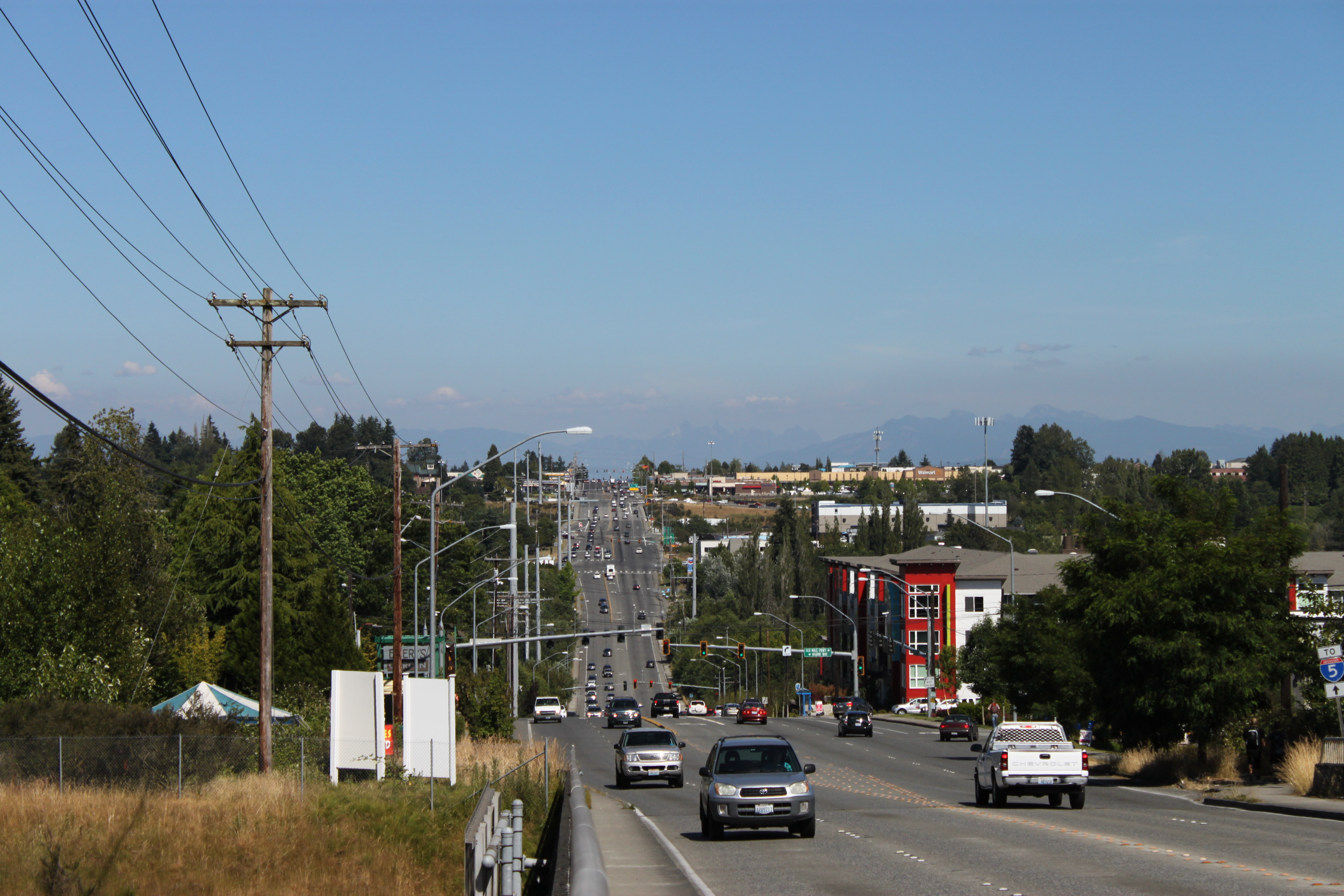
Looking east on 164th Street Southwest in Lynnwood's urban growth area towards Mill Creek and the Cascade Mountains

According to the United States Census Bureau, the city of Lynnwood has a total area of 7.86 square miles (20.36 km^{2}), of which 7.84 square miles (20.31 km^{2}) is land and 0.02 square miles (0.05 km^{2}) is water. The city is in the southwestern part of Snohomish County in Western Washington, and is considered part of the Seattle metropolitan area. It is at the junction of Interstate 5 and Interstate 405, approximately 16 miles (26 km) north of Seattle, 19 miles (31 km) northwest of Bellevue, and 13 miles (21 km) south of Everett.

Lynnwood's city limits are roughly defined to south by Mountlake Terrace at 212th Street Southwest and the Interurban Trail; to the west by Edmonds along 76th Avenue West and Olympic View Drive; to the north by the unincorporated Picnic Point-North Lynnwood area, near 164th Street Southwest; and to the east and south by the unincorporated Alderwood Manor, along State Route 525 and Interstate 5. The city's urban growth area (UGA) includes Alderwood Manor and part of North Lynnwood, extending east to Locust Way and Mill Creek, and north to the Mukilteo UGA at 148th Street Southwest.

Lynnwood is situated 300 to 600 feet (91 to 183 m) on a plateau above Puget Sound, which lies to the city's west, and consists of several hills and valleys. The city has eighteen identified drainage basins, most of which drain into Swamp Creek or Puget Sound via Lund's Gulch. Other natural features within Lynnwood include Scriber Lake and Hall Lake. One of the highest hills in the Seattle area is 649-foot (198 m) Lake Serene Hill, near the lake of the same name. The city has extensive views of the Olympic Mountains to the west and the Cascade Mountains to the east.

The main retail and commercial corridor of the city is the "Lynnwood Triangle", bordered to the east by Interstate 5, to the south by Southwest 196th Street, and to the west by 44th Avenue West. The "Triangle" area has been proposed as the site of a city center for Lynnwood since the 1980s, including planning for a light rail station and high-density development surrounding it.

== Economy ==
Largest employers (2015)
| Employer | Employees |
|---|---|
| 1. Edmonds School District | 2,965 |
| 2. City of Lynnwood | 513 |
| 3. Nordstrom | 490 |
| 4. Costco | 488 |
| 5. Macy's | 366 |
| 6. Fred Meyer | 306 |
| 7. J. C. Penney | 241 |
| 8. ADP | 211 |
| 9. Zumiez | 211 |
| 10. Target Corporation | 181 |

As of 2015, Lynnwood has an estimated 19,095 residents who were in the workforce, either employed or unemployed. Only 12 percent of Lynnwood residents work within city limits, while approximately 31 percent commute to Seattle, 9 percent to Everett, 6 percent to Bellevue, and 4 percent to Edmonds. Regional job centers in Downtown Seattle, the Boeing assembly plant near Paine Field in Everett, Downtown Bellevue, and the Microsoft Redmond Campus employ the majority of Lynnwood workers. The average one-way commute for Lynnwood workers in 2015 was approximately 30 minutes; 69 percent of workers drove alone to their workplace, while 12 percent carpooled, and 10 percent used public transit. The largest industry of employment for Lynnwood workers are educational services and health care, with approximately 23 percent, followed by retail (15%), food services (13%), and professional services (12%).

Lynnwood is also a major job center for Snohomish County, with approximately 24,767 jobs in 2012, but only seven percent of workers in Lynnwood live within the city limits. Over 52 percent of workers in Lynnwood reside within Snohomish County, while 9 percent reside in Seattle. The largest industry in Lynnwood is the services sector, with approximately 45 percent of workers, followed by retail (28%) and education (8%). The retail sector, centered around Alderwood Mall, employs 7,000 people and generates 50 percent of the city's tax revenue. Professional services are concentrated in office parks near Alderwood Mall, comprising 176 buildings with nearly 2.8 million square feet (260,000 m^{2}) of leasable office space. The largest non-retail employers in the city include the Edmonds School District, the city government, and Automatic Data Processing (ADP). Clothing retailer Zumiez and knife manufacturer SOG Specialty Knives are headquartered in Lynnwood.

== Demographics ==
Historical population
| Census | Pop. | Note | %± |
|---|---|---|---|
| 1960 | 7,207 | | — |
| 1970 | 16,919 | | 134.8% |
| 1980 | 22,641 | | 33.8% |
| 1990 | 28,695 | | 26.7% |
| 2000 | 33,847 | | 18.0% |
| 2010 | 35,836 | | 5.9% |
| 2020 | 38,568 | | 7.6% |
| 2024 (est.) | 41,597 | | 7.9% |
U.S. Decennial Census

Lynnwood is the fourth most populous city in Snohomish County, with 38,568 people counted during the 2020 U.S. census. The 1960 census counted 7,207 residents within Lynnwood city limits, which grew by 134 percent to nearly 17,000 at the 1970 census. From 1970 to 1990, the city's population nearly doubled through annexations and suburban development. During this period, Lynnwood gained a large population of Asian Americans, primarily of Korean and Vietnamese origin, eventually growing to 14 percent of the city's population by 2000. The estimated population of Lynnwood was 36,420 in 2015, with an additional 28,973 people living outside city limits in Lynnwood's urban growth area. By 2035, the Lynnwood area is projected to have a population of over 92,000 people, including 54,400 people within the current city limits.

=== 2020 census ===
As of the 2020 census, there were 38,568 people and 15,401 households living in Lynnwood, which had a population density of 4,896.3 inhabitants per square mile (1,890.5/km^{2}). There were 16,212 total housing units, of which 95.0% were occupied and 5.0% were vacant or for occasional use. The racial makeup of the city was 52.4% White, 1.1% Native American and Alaskan Native, 7.4% Black or African American, 19.2% Asian, and 0.7% Native Hawaiian and Pacific Islander. Residents who listed another race were 8.1% of the population and those who identified as more than one race were 11.2% of the population. Hispanic or Latino residents of any race were 15.7% of the population.

Of the 15,401 households in Lynnwood, 41.8% were married couples living together and 7.5% were cohabitating but unmarried. Households with a male householder with no spouse or partner were 20.9% of the population, while households with a female householder with no spouse or partner were 29.9% of the population. Out of all households, 27.4% had children under the age of 18 living with them and 32.1% had residents who were 65 years of age or older. There were 15,401 occupied housing units in Lynnwood, of which 49.7% were owner-occupied and 50.3% were occupied by renters.

The median age in the city was 39.7 years old for all sexes, 38.0 years old for males, and 41.5 years old for females. Of the total population, 22.0% of residents were under the age of 19; 28.4% were between the ages of 20 and 39; 32.0% were between the ages of 40 and 64; and 17.7% were 65 years of age or older. The gender makeup of the city was 48.9% male and 51.1% female.

=== 2010 census ===
As of the 2010 census, there were 35,836 people, 13,950 households, and 8,501 families residing in the city of Lynnwood. The population density was 4,570.9 inhabitants per square mile (1,764.8/km^{2}). There were 14,939 housing units at an average density of 1,905.5 per square mile (735.7/km^{2}). The racial makeup of the city was 63.8% White (58.6% non-Hispanic white), 5.5% African American, 1.1% Native American, 17.3% Asian, 0.5% Pacific Islander, 6.6% from other races, and 5.1% from two or more races. Hispanic or Latino of any race were 13.3% of the population.

There were 14,107 households, of which 26.9% had children under the age of 18 living with them, 42.6% were married couples living together, 12.2% had a female householder with no husband present, 5.5% had a male householder with no wife present, and 39.7% were non-families. 30.8% of all households were made up of individuals, and 9.4% had someone living alone who was 65 years of age or older. The average household size was 2.50 and the average family size was 3.13.

The median age in the city was 37.3 years. 21.7% of residents were under the age of 18; 10.6% were between the ages of 18 and 24; 28% were from 25 to 44; 26.2% were from 45 to 64; and 13.4% were 65 years of age or older. The gender makeup of the city was 49% male and 51% female.

=== Crime ===
Lynnwood
- Crime rates* (2015)

Violent crimes
- Homicide: 3
- Rape: 14
- Robbery: 92
- Aggravated assault: 111
- Total violent crime: 220

Property crimes
- Burglary: 507
- Larceny-theft: 4,940
- Motor vehicle theft: 415
- Arson: 5
- Total property crime: 5,861
- Note: Reported crimes per 100,000 population Source: 2015 FBI UCR Data

The Lynnwood Police Department has 70 officers and 38 support staff, overseen by chief Tom Davis since his appointment to the position in August 2016. In 2015, Lynnwood had 81 violent crimes and 2,162 property crimes reported to law enforcement. The city's violent crime rate was 220 per 100,000 people, ranking below the national and state averages; the property crime rate of 5,861 per 100,000 people was significantly above the national and state averages. Lynnwood has a relatively low overall crime rate compared to cities of the same size in Washington state, but ranks high for property crime, particularly larceny attributed to the nearby Alderwood Mall. In an effort to curb traffic violations, the city government installed twelve red light cameras and four school zone cameras that took approximately 44,000 photos per year as of 2017 and generated $3.4 million in ticket revenue in 2018.

The 2008 rape of a teenage woman in Lynnwood, part of a serial rape case, was the subject of "An Unbelievable Story of Rape", a Pulitzer Prize-winning article published by ProPublica and the Marshall Project. It was adapted into the true crime miniseries Unbelievable for Netflix in 2019. Between 2008 and 2012, Lynnwood police had labeled 21 percent of rape cases as "unfounded", five times the national average for similarly sized municipalities. The victim, known as "Marie", was initially dismissed by detectives with the Lynnwood police department before the assailant, a serial rapist, was charged and convicted for the rapes of five more women. The city government agreed to a $150,000 settlement in the victim's lawsuit in 2014 and later changed the police department's procedures on sexual assault investigations.

== Government and politics ==
Lynnwood is defined as a non-charter code city and operates under a mayor–council government, with a full-time mayor and city council elected by residents. The mayor serves a four-year term, with no term limits, and is joined in the Executive Department by an Executive Assistant and Assistant City Administrator. Former city councilmember George Hurst was elected mayor in 2025 after he defeated incumbent Christine Frizzell.

The Lynnwood city council is composed of seven residents who are elected in at-large, non-partisan elections to four-year terms that are staggered every two years. The council also appoints a city manager to oversee city operations. The council's meetings are held twice per month in a chamber at Lynnwood's city hall. According to the Washington State Auditor, Lynnwood's municipal government employs 373 people full-time and operates on a biennial budget of $197.5 million. It collects revenue from various sources, including property taxes, business taxes, and sales taxes. As of 2024, the combined sales tax rate in Lynnwood is 10.6 percent, tied for the highest in Washington; 1.1 percent of the sales tax is collected by the municipal government, while other regional and county services have their own portions. The municipal government provides emergency services, water and sewage utilities, street maintenance, parks and recreation, and the municipal court and jail. The municipal government has contracted with South County Fire to provide firefighting and emergency medical services since it was formed in 2017 by a merger of the Lynnwood fire department and a county fire district.

At the federal level, Lynnwood is part of Washington's 2nd congressional district, which also encompasses western Snohomish County, Island County, Skagit County, and Whatcom County. It is represented by Democrat Rick Larsen; prior to the 2012 redistricting in Washington, Lynnwood was part of the 1st congressional district. At the state level, the city is part of the 32nd legislative district, which also includes Mountlake Terrace, Shoreline, Woodway, and portions of Edmonds and Seattle. Lynnwood was part of the 21st legislative district until 2012. Lynnwood is wholly part of the Snohomish County Council's 3rd district, alongside Edmonds and Woodway.

== Education ==
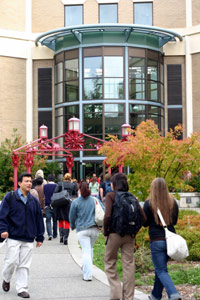
Snoqualmie Hall, a building shared by Edmonds College and Central Washington University, 2007

Public schools in Lynnwood are operated by the Edmonds School District, which also serves the cities of Edmonds, Mountlake Terrace, and Woodway. The district had an enrollment of approximately 20,847 students in 2014 and has 41 schools, of which 16 are located in or around Lynnwood. The Edmonds School District has three high schools located in the Lynnwood area: Lynnwood High School, Meadowdale High School, and Scriber Lake High School. The Lynnwood High School was originally located adjacent to Alderwood Mall, but moved to a new campus a mile (1.6 km) east on North Road in northern Bothell.

Lynnwood is also home to two post-secondary educational institutions. Edmonds College, established in 1967, offers two-year degree programs and other services. It enrolls an average of 11,100 students per quarter. Central Washington University offers four-year bachelor's degrees in select programs at its Lynnwood campus, which it has shared with Edmonds College since 1975.

Lynnwood also has several private schools, both religious and secular. These include The Soundview School, St. Thomas More Parish, and Soundview School.

== Culture ==
=== Parks and recreation ===
The city of Lynnwood has over 350 acres (140 ha) of open space in 19 community and neighborhood parks, as well as 14 miles (23 km) of recreational trails. Part of the open space is set aside as natural conservation areas, including Lund's Gulch and Scriber Creek. The city also has special recreational facilities, including a municipal golf course, skate park, sports fields, a water park, and a senior center. Central Lynnwood has two major parks: the Scriber Lake nature reserve; and Wilcox Park, the first park in the city, established in 1962. The city government also organizes several regular community events, including the annual Fair on 44th block party, movie screenings, and Shakespeare in the Park.

=== Media ===
From 1958 to 2012, Lynnwood and southern Snohomish County were served by a weekly newspaper, The Enterprise. The newspaper was acquired by The Everett Herald in 1996 and renamed to The Weekly Herald in 2011. The Weekly Herald published its final issue on August 29, 2012, due to revenue issues. The city is home to Lynnwood Today, a local blog that was established in March 2010 and was affiliated with The Seattle Times; it was acquired by My Edmonds News, which also owns MLTnews, in 2013.

Lynnwood is part of the Seattle–Tacoma media market, and is served by Seattle-based media outlets including The Seattle Times; broadcast television stations KOMO-TV, KING-TV, KIRO-TV, and KCPQ-TV; and various radio stations. Non-commercial radio station KSER was based in Lynnwood from 1991 to 1994, when it moved to Everett.

Lynnwood opened its municipal public library on October 1, 1960, in a repurposed home adjacent to the city hall; the city contracted services to the Snohomish County Library district, which became Sno-Isle Libraries two years later when it merged with its Island County counterpart. The library moved in June 1963 to a 1,600-square-foot (150 m^{2}) space at the Thomas Center strip mall on 196th Street Southwest to accommodate an expansion of the city hall. The library relocated again in 1971 to a 7,860-square-foot (730 m^{2}) building at the civic center that opened on February 22. Amid increasing traffic from Lynnwood's growing population, the library building was expanded in 1984 to 14,000 square feet (1,300 m^{2}), then expanded again in 1999 to 26,000 square feet (2,400 m^{2}). Lynnwood residents voted in 2006 to be annexed into the Sno-Isle Libraries district, also approving an expansion and modernization that took place in 2013. The library is the most-visited in the Sno-Isle system, with 504,000 annual visits as of 2012.

=== Historical preservation ===
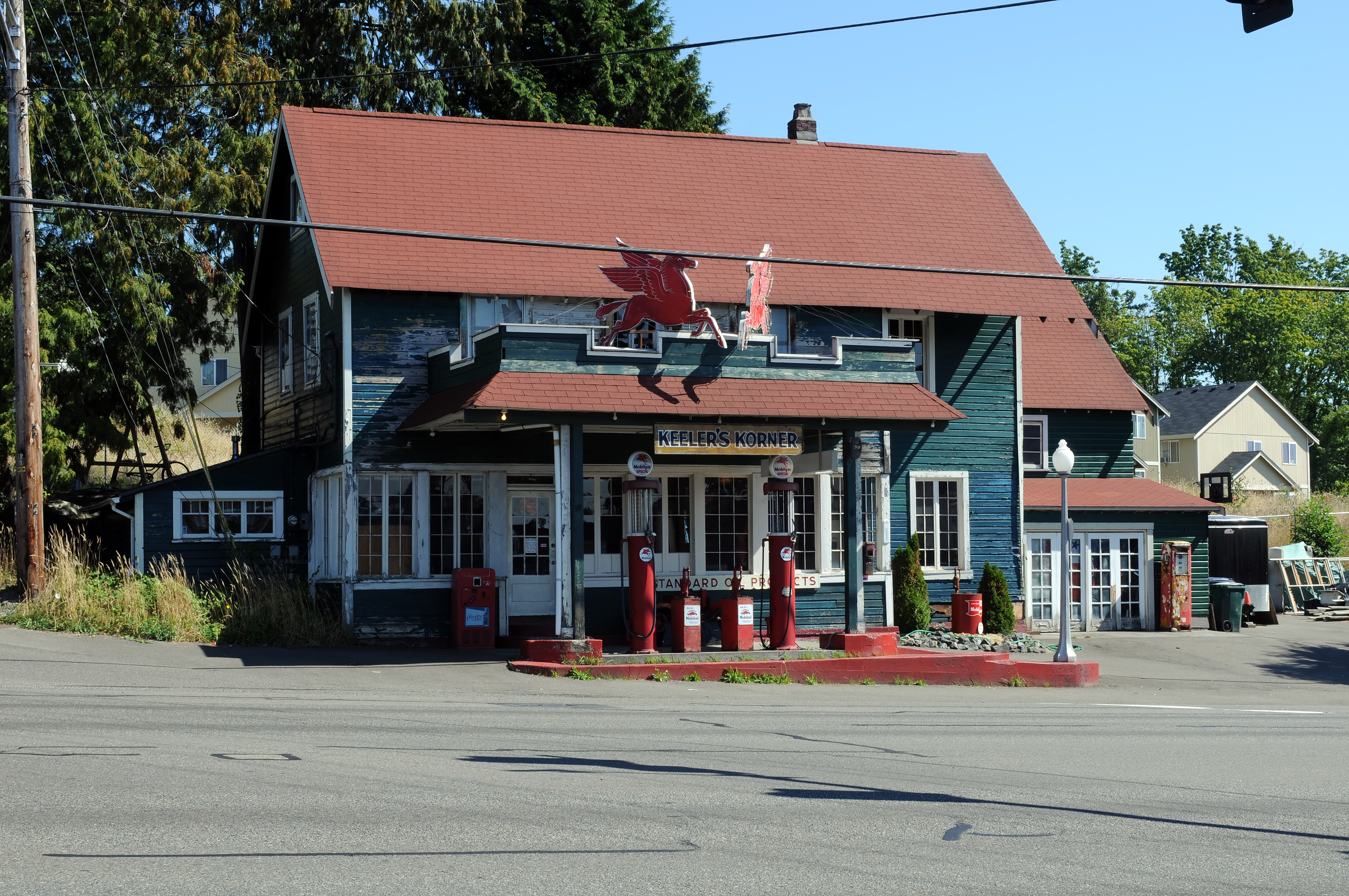
Keeler's Corner, a service station listed on the National Register of Historic Places

Lynnwood has one property listed on the National Register of Historic Places (NRHP): Keeler's Korner, an automobile service station built in 1927 on Highway 99 at 164th Street Southwest.

The Alderwood Manor Heritage Association was formed in 1991 after the demolition of the oldest home in Alderwood Manor, located east of Lynnwood city limits. The preservation group succeeded in saving other early 20th century homes that were slated for demolition during a highway expansion, moving them to a new, city-owned park. The $1.8 million Heritage Park, opened in 2004, includes the Tudor-style, timber-framed Wickers Building, originally built in 1919; a cottage built for the Alderwood Manor superintendent in 1917; and a restored Interurban trolley car.

The city has two other buildings determined to be eligible for a NRHP listing: the Masonic Temple, built in 1921; and a former schoolhouse built in 1917. Both buildings are located near the city center southwest of Alderwood Mall.

== Notable people ==
Notable people from Lynnwood include:

- Kenneth Bae, missionary and North Korean prisoner
- Steven W. Bailey, actor
- Brady Clark, curler
- Cristin Clark, curler
- Randy Couture, UFC/MMA fighter and actor
- Myles Gaskin, American football player
- Connor Hamlett, professional football player
- Riall Johnson, professional football player
- Teyo Johnson, professional football player
- Paul Kenneth Keller, serial arsonist
- Jason Larway, curler
- Paul Lyttle, curler
- Tom McGrath, animator and film director
- Edward Nixon, brother of President Richard Nixon
- Ongina, drag queen
- Mikayla Pivec, professional basketball player
- Lucien A. Schmit Jr., engineer
- Robert Shannon, boxer
- Travis Snider, professional baseball player
- Layne Staley, rock musician
- Katie Thurston, television personality, contestant and star on The Bachelorette

== Infrastructure ==
=== Transportation ===
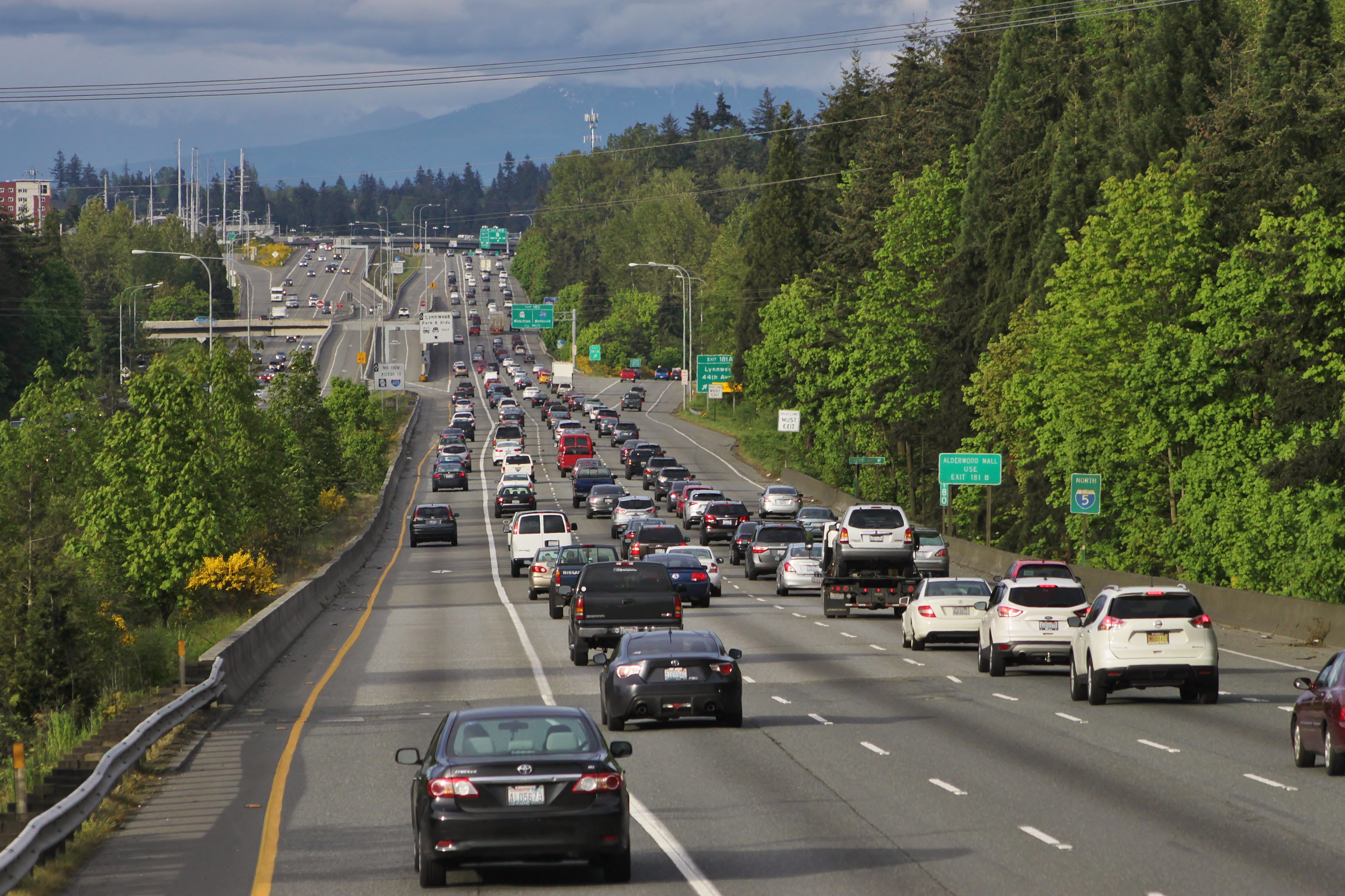
Interstate 5 approaching Lynnwood from the south

Lynnwood is located at the northern junction of Interstate 5 and Interstate 405, the two primary north–south freeways in the Seattle metropolitan area. Interstate 5 continues south to Downtown Seattle, and north to Everett and Vancouver, British Columbia; Interstate 405 continues south to Bellevue and the Eastside, and north to Mukilteo as State Route 525. Lynnwood has two additional state highways: State Route 99, running north to Everett and south to Seattle; and State Route 524, connecting to Edmonds in the west as 196th Street Southwest.

Public transportation in Lynnwood is provided by Community Transit, which serves most of Snohomish County, and Sound Transit, the regional system for the entire metropolitan area. Most bus service in Lynnwood is concentrated at hubs, primarily Lynnwood City Center station, Ash Way Park and Ride, and Edmonds College. Community Transit operates local routes and two Swift Bus Rapid Transit lines that cross the city: Swift Blue Line on State Route 99, which opened in 2009; and the Swift Orange Line, which opened in 2024 and connects Edmonds College, Lynnwood City Center station, Alderwood, and Mill Creek. The agency also launched a ride-hailing service, Zip, in 2022 to serve areas in Lynnwood and Alderwood.

Sound Transit operates the regional Link light rail system, which was extended to Lynnwood City Center station on August 30, 2024. The 1 Line connects Lynnwood to Downtown Seattle and Seattle–Tacoma International Airport; the 2 Line connects to Downtown Seattle, Bellevue, and Redmond. The light rail station also serves as a major regional bus hub with commuter bus service from across Snohomish County truncated at Lynnwood City Center station. Sound Transit also operates express buses from Lynnwood City Center station and Ash Way Park and Ride to Downtown Bellevue; the Lynnwood–Bellevue service is planned to be replaced with a Stride bus rapid transit line by 2028. Link service is planned to be extended north to Downtown Everett, via Ash Way and Paine Field, by 2037 or 2041 depending on funding.

=== Utilities ===
Electric power in Lynnwood is provided by the Snohomish County Public Utility District (PUD), a consumer-owned public utility that serves all of Snohomish County. Puget Sound Energy provides natural gas service to the city; Lynnwood is also the terminus of a minor gas pipeline operated by the Northwest Pipeline Company.

The Alderwood Water and Wastewater District provides municipal tap water service for Lynnwood, sourced from Everett's Spada Lake Reservoir. The City of Lynnwood handles sanitary sewer and wastewater treatment; its wastewater treatment plant treats 5 million gallons per day (19,000 m^{3}) that is discharged into Puget Sound. The water district serves the unincorporated areas around Lynnwood and also operates Well Number 5, an artesian well in North Lynnwood that has gained popularity for its quality. The city contracts with Republic Services and Waste Management for garbage, recycling, and yard waste disposal.

=== Health care ===
Lynnwood does not have any general hospitals, but is located near the Edmonds branch of Swedish Medical Center, formerly known as Stevens Hospital. The city has several community and specialty clinics operated by regional healthcare providers, including the Community Health Center of Snohomish County, Virginia Mason, and The Everett Clinic. A 16-bed mental health care center adjacent to the Lynnwood jail and police station was approved by the city government in 2021 at a cost of $20 million. The operator of the center, Recovery Innovations, withdrew from the project as it neared completion and prevented it from opening as scheduled in 2025.

== Sister city ==
- Damyang, South Korea
