= Well Number 5 =

Artesian well in North Lynnwood, Washington, USA

Coordinates: 47.8500°N 122.266°W

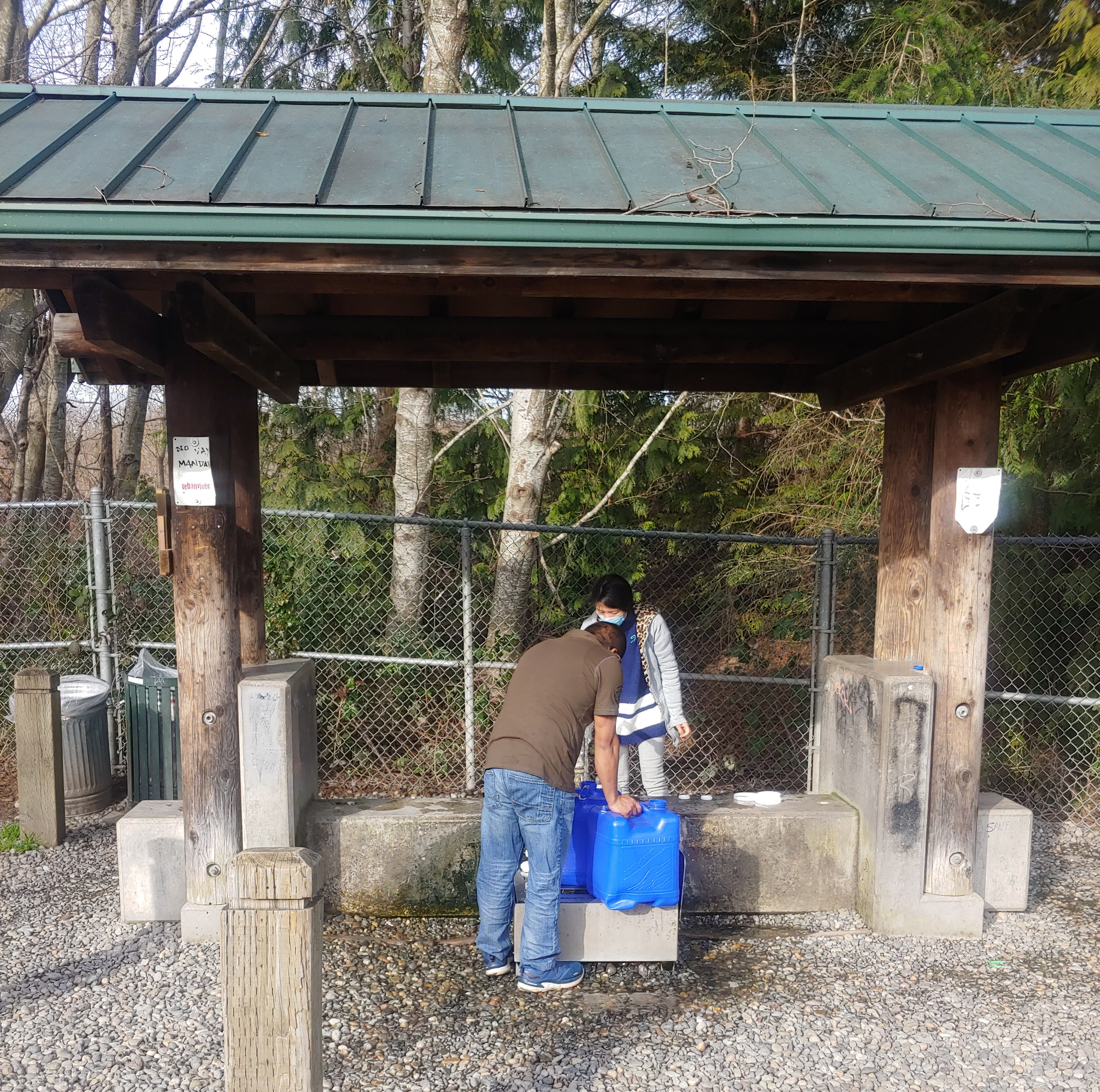
Two people filling water containers at Well Number 5

Well Number 5, also called 164th Street Artesian Well, is an artesian well in North Lynnwood, Washington at Swamp Creek. The well puts out between 10–50 US gallons (38–189 L; 8.3–41.6 imp gal) per minute. (Note: An official Washington State Department of Ecology document states a flow rate of 50 gallons per minute; popular press often states 10 gallons per minute.)

It is one of ten artesian wells that originally supplied the Alderwood area in the 1950s. The other nine were capped when the water district contracted with the city of Everett for its supply. Well Number 5, originally drilled with a 12-inch (300 mm) pipe to 438 feet (134 m) and backfilled, taps the Intercity Aquifer between 100–200 feet (30–61 m) below the surface. In 1999, the well's "secret" location was revealed in connection with public planning related to unrelated city development, upsetting some people, (Note: A Seattle Post-Intelligencer columnist defended himself to his readers saying "Some readers "thought that I'd 'ruined a good thing'" by revealing Well Number 5's location in print, but "the 'secret' has been pretty much known for decades".) and in the early 2000s, when the well's taps were moved c. 100 feet (30 m) from a wooded area beside Swamp Creek to a more visible structure alongside 164th Street, the upgraded accessibility again met resistance from some people.

The water from the well is popular with people in the Puget Sound Area who prefer water without fluoridation or chlorination, including raw water enthusiasts and brewers. It is regularly tested for microbes and contamination, and is "one of the rare raw water sources in the country that is also part of a public water district and is held to the same strict EPA and Department of Health standards as tap [water]". As of 2016, the well had never failed a quality test in 60 years. The water district that owns the well won American Water Works Association's national tapwater taste test in 2018.

The well is established as part of the culture of Lynnwood. It has been cited as a "welcome touch of the country" reminiscent of Lynnwood's previously rural character, now become a "bland city".
