= Swamp Creek (Sammamish River tributary) =

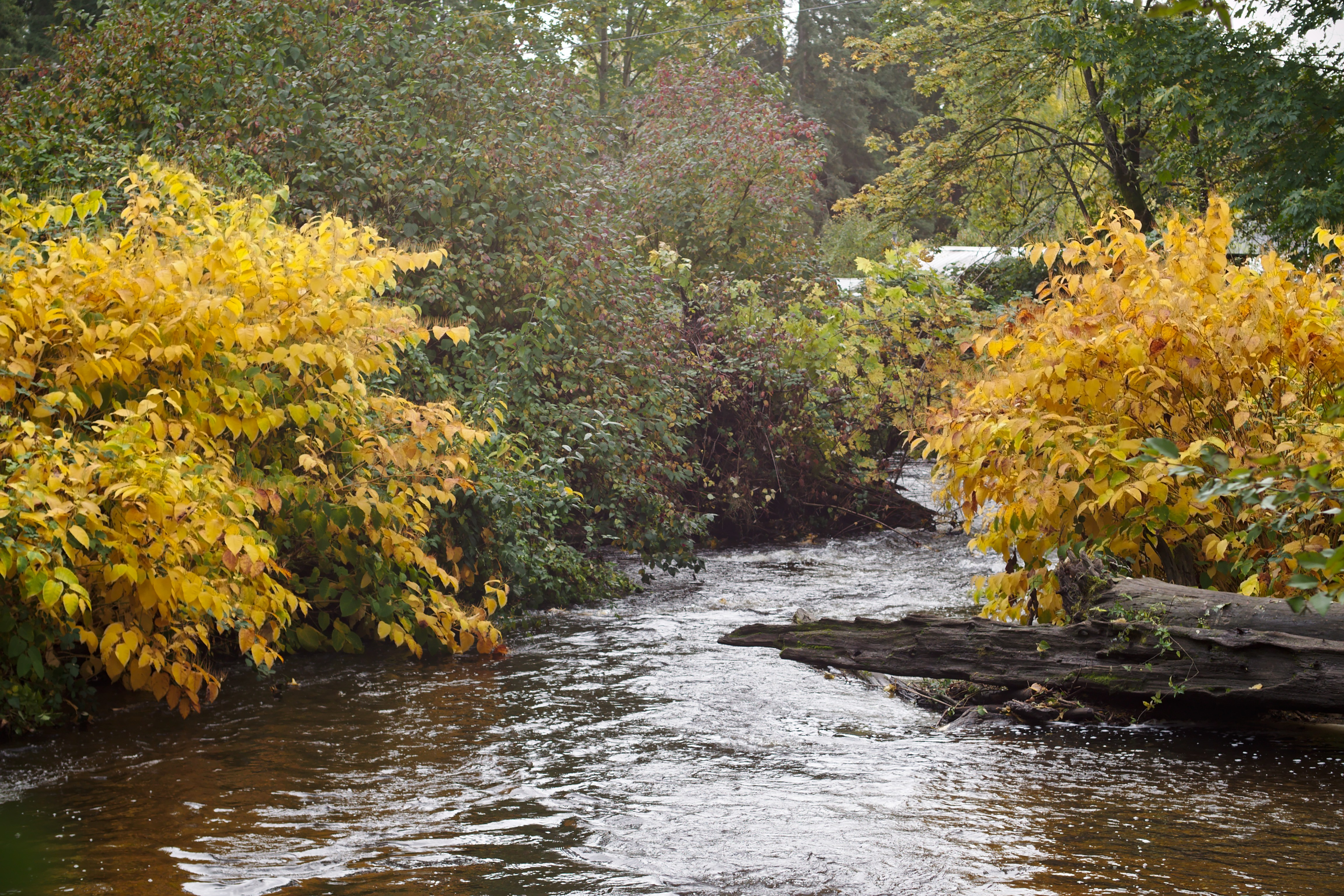
- Swamp Creek in Kenmore

- Location of the mouth of Swamp Creek in Washington Swamp Creek (Sammamish River tributary) (the United States)

Location
- Country: United States
- State: Washington
- Counties: King, Snohomish

Physical characteristics
- Source: Lake Stickney
  - coordinates: 47°52′28″N 122°15′28″W
- Mouth: Sammamish River
  - coordinates: 47°45′14″N 122°14′30″W
- Length: 11 mi (18 km)
- Basin size: 25 sq mi (65 km^{2})
- Discharge
  - location: USGS gage 12127100 at Kenmore, WA, river mile 0.5
  - average: 33.9 cu ft/s (0.96 m^{3}/s)
  - minimum: 2.8 cu ft/s (0.079 m^{3}/s)
  - maximum: 1,090 cu ft/s (31 m^{3}/s)

Swamp Creek is a tributary of the Sammamish River in Snohomish and King counties, in the U.S. state of Washington. It is also known as dxʷɬ(ə)q̓ab in Lushootseed, meaning "a wide place".

Swamp Creek starts at Lake Stickney near Everett. It ends in Kenmore at the Sammamish River, which then flows into Lake Washington.

== Major tributaries ==
Swamp Creek receives a large amount of water from smaller creeks in the Swamp Creek sub-basin.

- Scriber Creek, mostly in Lynnwood city limits, enters Swamp Creek near Brier.
  - Golde Creek, begins near Alderwood Mall, enters Scriber Creek in Brier.
  - Poplar Creek, mostly runs near Poplar Way outside Lynnwood, enters Scriber Creek near Brier.
- Martha Creek, begins at Martha Lake, flows into Swamp Creek near Locust Way & Filbert Road east of Lynnwood.

== See also ==
- List of rivers of Washington (state)
