= Meadowdale, Washington =

- CDP
- Location within Washington (state)
- Coordinates: 47°51′30″N 122°18′58″W
- Country: United States
- State: Washington
- County: Snohomish

Area
  - Total: 1.07 sq mi (2.8 km^{2})
  - Land: 1.07 sq mi (2.8 km^{2})
- Elevation: 449 ft (137 m)

Population (2020)
  - Total: 3,148
  - Density: 2,940/sq mi (1,140/km^{2})
  - Summer (DST): Pacific
- Area code: 425

Meadowdale is a census-designated place (CDP) located in Snohomish County, Washington. As of the 2020 census, Meadowdale had a population of 3,148. It was the first incorporated city in Snohomish County.

A post office called Meadowdale was established in 1904, and remained in operation until 1938. The community was named by settler Robert Maltby for a meadow near the original town site.

== Geography ==
Meadowdale is located along the eastern edge of Possession Sound in an area bounded by the cities of Edmonds and Lynnwood to the south, 148th Street Southwest to the north, and 52nd Avenue West to the east. All residences in the area use Edmonds addresses. The land area is 1.07 sq. miles.

The area has been the target of annexation efforts in the early 21st century by the cities of Edmonds, Lynnwood, and Mukilteo.

== Demographics ==
Historical population
| Census | Pop. | Note | %± |
|---|---|---|---|
| 2010 | 2,826 | | — |
| 2020 | 3,148 | | 11.4% |
U.S. Decennial Census; 2000 2010

Meadowdale first appeared as a census designated place in the 2010 U.S. census formed from part of the deleted Picnic Point-North Lynnwood CDP.

=== Racial and ethnic composition ===
Meadowdale CDP, Washington – Racial and ethnic composition Note: the US Census treats Hispanic/Latino as an ethnic category. This table excludes Latinos from the racial categories and assigns them to a separate category. Hispanics/Latinos may be of any race.
| Race / Ethnicity (NH = Non-Hispanic) | Pop 2010 | Pop 2020 | % 2010 | % 2020 |
|---|---|---|---|---|
| White alone (NH) | 2,230 | 2,095 | 78.91% | 66.55% |
| Black or African American alone (NH) | 67 | 155 | 2.37% | 4.92% |
| Native American or Alaska Native alone (NH) | 19 | 26 | 0.67% | 0.83% |
| Asian alone (NH) | 231 | 344 | 8.17% | 10.93% |
| Native Hawaiian or Pacific Islander alone (NH) | 8 | 22 | 0.28% | 0.70% |
| Other race alone (NH) | 6 | 37 | 0.21% | 1.18% |
| Mixed race or Multiracial (NH) | 114 | 243 | 4.03% | 7.72% |
| Hispanic or Latino (any race) | 151 | 226 | 5.34% | 7.18% |
| Total | 2,826 | 3,148 | 100.00% | 100.00% |
