= Lucien A. Schmit Jr. =

American engineer (1928–2018)

Lucien André Schmit Jr. (May 5, 1928 – March 16, 2018) was an American engineer.

He worked at Grumman between 1951 and 1953, then joined the Aeroelastic and Structures Research Laboratory at the Massachusetts Institute of Technology. Schmit left MIT for the Case Institute of Technology in 1958, and was named Wilbert J. Austin Distinguished Professor of Engineering in 1969. The next year, Schmit began teaching at the University of California, Los Angeles. He was granted membership in the National Academy of Engineering in 1985, and retired from UCLA in 1993. Schmitt died at the age of 89 on March 16, 2018, at home in Lynnwood, Washington.
