= Picnic Point, Washington =

- CDP
- Location within Washington (state)
- Coordinates: 47°51′37″N 122°17′40″W
- Country: United States
- State: Washington
- County: Snohomish

Area
  - Total: 10.4 km^{2} (4.01 sq mi)
  - Land: 7.9 km^{2} (3.04 sq mi)
  - Water: 0.18 km^{2} (0.07 sq mi)
- Elevation: 24 m (79 ft)

Population (2020)
  - Total: 9,768
  - Density: 1,240/km^{2} (3,210/sq mi)
- Time zone: Pacific
- Area code: 360

Picnic Point is a census-designated place (CDP) located in Snohomish County, Washington. As of the 2020 census, Picnic Point had a population of 9,768. It was formerly part of the Picnic Point-North Lynnwood CDP.

== Geography ==
Picnic Point is located at coordinates 47°51'37"N 122°17'40"W. The elevation is 79 feet.

Picnic Point Park, located on the Puget Sound coastline, offers access to the beach as well as views of the sound, Whidbey Island, and the Olympic Mountains.

== Demographics ==
Historical population
Census	Pop.	Note	%±
2010	8,809		—
2020	9,768		10.9%
U.S. Decennial Census; 2000 2010

Picnic Point first appeared as a census designated place in the 2010 U.S. census formed from part of deleted Picnic Point-North Lynnwood CDP.

=== Racial and ethnic composition ===
Picnic Point CDP, Washington – Racial and ethnic composition Note: the US Census treats Hispanic/Latino as an ethnic category. This table excludes Latinos from the racial categories and assigns them to a separate category. Hispanics/Latinos may be of any race.
Race / Ethnicity (NH = Non-Hispanic)	Pop 2010	Pop 2020	% 2010	% 2020
White alone (NH)	6,417	6,309	72.85%	64.59%
Black or African American alone (NH)	205	389	2.33%	3.98%
Native American or Alaska Native alone (NH)	76	56	0.86%	0.57%
Asian alone (NH)	1,175	1,618	13.34%	16.56%
Native Hawaiian or Pacific Islander alone (NH)	27	29	0.31%	0.30%
Other race alone (NH)	9	51	0.10%	0.52%
Mixed race or Multiracial (NH)	396	656	4.50%	6.72%
Hispanic or Latino (any race)	504	660	5.72%	6.76%
Total	8,809	9,768	100.00%	100.00%

== Education ==
It is a part of the Mukilteo School District.
