= Picnic Point-North Lynnwood, Washington =

- former CDP
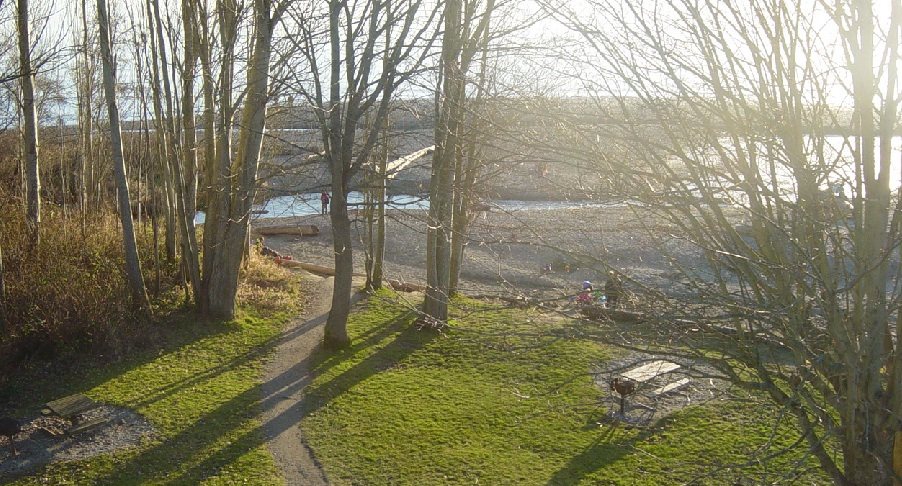
- View from Vander Linden Memorial Overpass overlooking the park and beach at Picnic Point

- Location of Picnic Point-North Lynnwood, Washington
- Coordinates: 47°51′37″N 122°17′40″W
- Country: United States
- State: Washington
- County: Snohomish

Area
  - Total: 7.5 sq mi (19.3 km^{2})
  - Land: 7.4 sq mi (19.1 km^{2})
  - Water: 0.077 sq mi (0.2 km^{2})

Population (2000)
  - Total: 22,953
  - Density: 3,115/sq mi (1,202.6/km^{2})
- Time zone: UTC-8 (Pacific (PST))
  - Summer (DST): UTC-7 (PDT)
- FIPS code: 53-54215

Picnic Point-North Lynnwood is a former census-designated place (CDP) in Snohomish County, Washington, United States. The population was 22,953 at the 2000 census. For the 2010 census, the CDP was separated into Picnic Point and North Lynnwood, with a small part going to the new Meadowdale CDP.

== Geography ==
Picnic Point-North Lynnwood is located at 47°51′37″N 122°17′40″W (47.860227, -122.294545).

According to the United States Census Bureau, the CDP had a total area of 7.4 square miles (19.3 km^{2}), of which, 7.4 square miles (19.1 km^{2}) of it is land and 0.1 square miles (0.2 km^{2}) of it (0.94%) is water.

== Demographics ==
Historical population
Census	Pop.	Note	%±
2000	22,953		—
U.S. Decennial Census; 1970 1980 1990; 2000 2010

Picnic Point-North Lynnwood first appeared as a census designated place in the 2000 U.S. census. It was slot into the Picnic Point CDP and the North Lynnwood CDP for the 2020 U.S. census.

=== 2000 census ===
As of 2000 census, there were 22,953 people, 8,698 households, and 5,992 families residing in the CDP. The population density was 3,114.7 people per square mile (1,202.5/km^{2}). There were 9,160 housing units at an average density of 1,243.0/sq mi (479.9/km^{2}). The racial makeup of the CDP was 79.21% White, 2.20% African American, 0.88% Native American, 11.03% Asian, 0.31% Pacific Islander, 2.02% from other races, and 4.36% from two or more races. Hispanic or Latino of any race were 4.78% of the population.

There were 8,698 households, out of which 36.3% had children under the age of 18 living with them, 53.6% were married couples living together, 10.5% had a female householder with no husband present, and 31.1% were non-families. 21.7% of all households were made up of individuals, and 3.5% had someone living alone who was 65 years of age or older. The average household size was 2.63 and the average family size was 3.11.

In the CDP, the age distribution of the population shows 26.3% under the age of 18, 10.4% from 18 to 24, 34.0% from 25 to 44, 22.9% from 45 to 64, and 6.4% who were 65 years of age or older. The median age was 33 years. For every 100 females, there were 99.6 males. For every 100 females age 18 and over, there were 98.3 males.

The median income for a household in the CDP was $54,913, and the median income for a family was $65,252. Males had a median income of $45,459 versus $31,438 for females. The per capita income for the CDP was $24,003. About 5.3% of families and 6.9% of the population were below the poverty line, including 7.5% of those under age 18 and 7.4% of those age 65 or over.
