= Alderwood Manor, Washington =

- CDP
- Location of Alderwood Manor, Washington
- Coordinates: 47°48′9″N 122°15′31″W
- Country: United States
- State: Washington
- County: Snohomish

Area
  - Total: 1.9 sq mi (4.9 km^{2})
  - Land: 1.9 sq mi (4.9 km^{2})
  - Water: 0 sq mi (0.0 km^{2})
- Elevation: 423 ft (129 m)

Population (2020)
  - Total: 10,198
  - Density: 5,390/sq mi (2,081.2/km^{2})
- Time zone: UTC-8 (PST)
  - Summer (DST): UTC-7 (PDT)
- ZIP code: 98036
- Area code: 425
- FIPS code: 53-01185
- GNIS feature ID: 1511955

Alderwood Manor is a census-designated place (CDP) in Snohomish County, Washington, United States. The population was 10,198 at the 2020 census. Prior to the 2000 census, Alderwood Manor was counted as part of the Alderwood Manor-Bothell North CDP.

== Geography ==
According to the United States Census Bureau, the CDP has a total area of 1.9 square miles (4.9 km^{2}).

Parts of Alderwood Manor lie in the Lynnwood MUGA (Municipal Urban Growth Area). Depending on location, buildings in Alderwood Manor may use either Lynnwood, Bothell, or Brier mailing addresses.

== History ==
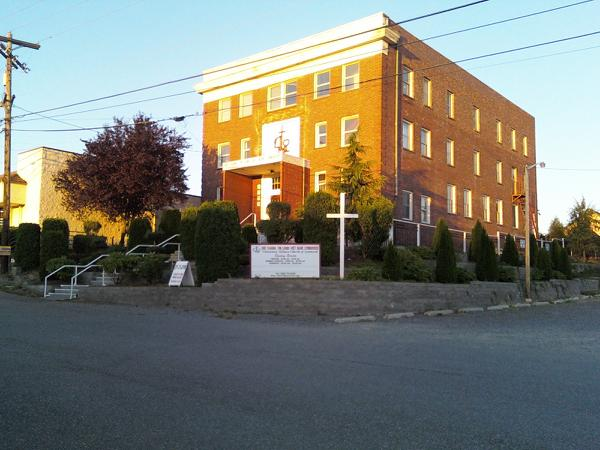
Former Masonic Temple built in 1919 near 36th Ave W and 196th St Sw in Lynnwood.

Alderwood Manor was a community that is now the cities of Lynnwood, Brier, and Mountlake Terrace. Alderwood Manor was a farming community where most residents raised chickens. Alderwood Manor was connected to Everett and Seattle by the Seattle-Everett Interurban Railway. Most signs of Alderwood have since disappeared but in 2004 Lynnwood's Heritage Park opened. The Heritage Park has some old buildings of the Lynnwood area, such as The Wickers Building, which served as Alderwood's main store and post office from 1919 to the 1960s. Other buildings included Car 55 of the interurban.

In 1979 Lynnwood's largest tourist attraction, the Alderwood Mall was built.

The only Alderwood Manor building still in the same place as when it was built is the old Masonic Temple. The Manor Hardware building (originally used as a schoolhouse in the early 1900s, but which had been vacant for many years) was demolished in 2015. Both locations are just off of 196th St SW in Lynnwood. Some private homes still stand in the area as well.

== Demographics ==
Historical population
Census	Pop.	Note	%±
1980	16,524		—
1990	22,945		38.9%
2000	15,329		−33.2%
2010	8,442		−44.9%
2020	10,198		20.8%
U.S. Decennial Census; 1970 1980 1990; 2000 2010 2020

The community first appeared as a census designated place under the name Alderwood Manor-Bothell North in the 1980 U.S. census. For the 2000 U.S. census, the name was changed to Alderwood Manor.

=== Racial and ethnic composition ===
Alderwood Manor CDP, Washington – Racial and ethnic composition Note: the US Census treats Hispanic/Latino as an ethnic category. This table excludes Latinos from the racial categories and assigns them to a separate category. Hispanics/Latinos may be of any race.
Race / Ethnicity (NH = Non-Hispanic)	Pop 2000	Pop 2010	Pop 2020	% 2000	% 2010	% 2020
White alone (NH)	12,334	5,543	5,432	80.46%	65.66%	53.27%
Black or African American alone (NH)	241	342	800	1.57%	4.05%	7.84%
Native American or Alaska Native alone (NH)	123	57	65	0.80%	0.68%	0.64%
Asian alone (NH)	1,482	1,475	1,806	9.67%	17.47%	17.71%
Native Hawaiian or Pacific Islander alone (NH)	70	60	50	0.46%	0.71%	0.49%
Other race alone (NH)	6	13	63	0.04%	0.15%	0.62%
Mixed race or Multiracial (NH)	464	377	713	3.03%	4.47%	6.99%
Hispanic or Latino (any race)	609	575	1,269	3.97%	6.81%	12.44%
Total	15,329	8,442	10,198	100.00%	100.00%	100.00%

=== 2020 census ===
As of the 2020 census, Alderwood Manor had a population of 10,198. The median age was 37.7 years. 21.9% of residents were under the age of 18 and 13.1% of residents were 65 years of age or older. For every 100 females there were 98.6 males, and for every 100 females age 18 and over there were 99.1 males age 18 and over.

100.0% of residents lived in urban areas, while 0.0% lived in rural areas.

There were 3,657 households in Alderwood Manor, of which 32.7% had children under the age of 18 living in them. Of all households, 50.9% were married-couple households, 17.7% were households with a male householder and no spouse or partner present, and 23.1% were households with a female householder and no spouse or partner present. About 21.0% of all households were made up of individuals and 7.2% had someone living alone who was 65 years of age or older.

There were 3,752 housing units, of which 2.5% were vacant. The homeowner vacancy rate was 0.7% and the rental vacancy rate was 3.5%.

Racial composition as of the 2020 census
Race	Number	Percent
White	5,641	55.3%
Black or African American	816	8.0%
American Indian and Alaska Native	90	0.9%
Asian	1,820	17.8%
Native Hawaiian and Other Pacific Islander	53	0.5%
Some other race	641	6.3%
Two or more races	1,137	11.1%

=== 2000 census ===
As of the census of 2000, there were 15,329 people, 5,558 households, and 4,090 families residing in the CDP. The population density was 3,194.6 people per square mile (1,233.0/km^{2}). There were 5,743 housing units at an average density of 1,196.8/sq mi (462.0/km^{2}). The racial makeup of the CDP was 52.12% White, 14.62% African American, 0.86% Native American, 9.82% Asian, 0.46% Pacific Islander, 1.59% from other races, and 3.53% from two or more races. Hispanic or Latino of any race were 26.97% of the population.

There were 5,558 households, out of which 40.6% had children under the age of 18 living with them, 60.4% were married couples living together, 9.2% had a female householder with no husband present, and 26.4% were non-families. 19.4% of all households were made up of individuals, and 5.9% had someone living alone who was 65 years of age or older. The average household size was 2.75 and the average family size was 3.17.

In the CDP, the age distribution of the population shows 28.1% under the age of 18, 7.1% from 18 to 24, 34.5% from 25 to 44, 21.6% from 45 to 64, and 8.7% who were 65 years of age or older. The median age was 35 years. For every 100 females, there were 98.3 males. For every 100 females age 18 and over, there were 96.4 males.

The median income for a household in the CDP was $61,199, and the median income for a family was $68,679. Males had a median income of $45,807 versus $33,099 for females. The per capita income for the CDP was $24,012. About 2.4% of families and 3.6% of the population were below the poverty line, including 4.0% of those under age 18 and 2.4% of those age 65 or over.

== Notable residents ==
- Edward Nixon, consultant and brother of President Richard Nixon
