= Alderwood Mall =

Alderwood

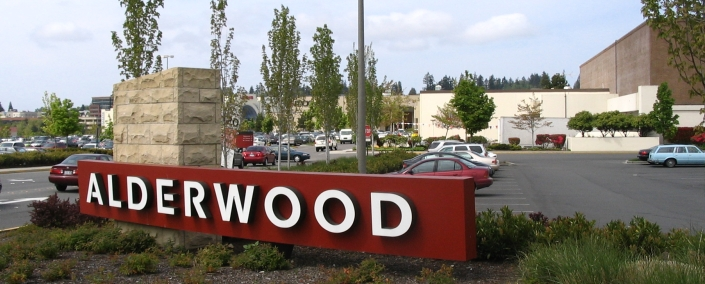
- East entrance to Alderwood, 2007.
- Location: Lynnwood, Washington
- Coordinates: 47°49′47″N 122°16′22″W
- Opened: October 4, 1979; 47 years ago
- Developer: Edward J. DeBartolo Corporation
- Manager: GGP
- Owner: GGP
- Num. of stores: 171
- Num. of anchor tenants: 3
- Floor area: 1.5 million square feet (140,000 m^{2})
- Floors: 1 (2 in anchors)
- Parking: 7,000
- Website: Official Website

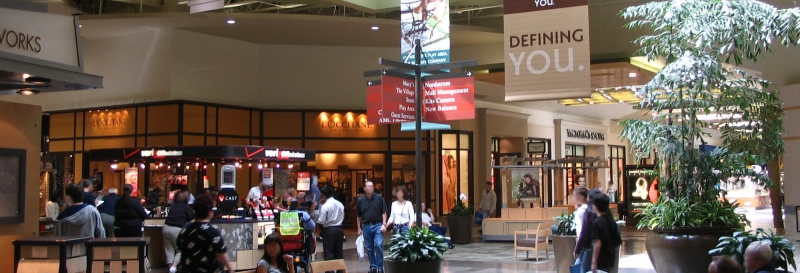
A look inside Alderwood, 2007.

Alderwood, formerly Alderwood Mall, is a regional shopping mall in Lynnwood, Washington. It is anchored by JCPenney, Macy's (formerly The Bon Marché) and Nordstrom and comprises both a traditional enclosed mall and two open-air areas known as The Village and The Terraces. It is operated by GGP, a subsidiary of Brookfield Properties.

Alderwood is Snohomish County's largest mall and one of the major malls in the Puget Sound region. It was named after the unincorporated area called Alderwood Manor where the mall is located, now part of the city of Lynnwood, Washington. The mall is home to one of the world's first Zumiez stores and the United States' first Daiso store.

== Description ==
Alderwood is located near the eastern edge of Lynnwood proper. It stands just west of the junction of Interstate 5, Interstate 405, and State Route 525 in an area bounded by 184th Street Southwest to the north, 33rd Avenue West to the west, Alderwood Mall Boulevard to the south, and Alderwood Mall Parkway to the east. The mall takes up much of the block from the northern end apart from the Alderwood Corner strip mall on the northwest corner. The remaining portion of the block to the south is mainly occupied by office buildings and strip malls, the latter of which include the Alderwood Towne Center and the Alderwood East Shopping Center. Another strip mall, Shane Plaza, was purchased by Alderwood Mall's then co-owner, General Growth Properties, in 2015.

The area to the north is occupied by the Lynnwood Place mixed-use development on land leased from the Edmonds School District, which formerly operated Lynnwood High School on the site; it includes a Costco, a Home Depot, four five-story apartment buildings containing 500 housing units and 18,000 square feet (1,700 m^{2}) of commercial space, and a peat bog that limits further potential development. The Edmonds School District also operated a bus barn on the southern end of the mall's block from the late 1980s until 2016, when it opened a new bus barn on 52nd Avenue West. The school district, which owned the land since the 1950s, agreed to sell it to Wolff Enterprises in 2017, but the developer backed out the following year despite filing permits for mixed-use development containing 240 housing units. The school district eventually reached an agreement with another developer, Trammell Crow Residential, to build a mixed-use development containing 383 housing units; known as Alexan Alderwood, it commenced construction in 2021 and was completed in 2023.

Alderwood Mall is served by several Community Transit local bus routes as well as Sound Transit Express for route 535, which travels from Lynnwood City Center station south to the Bellevue Transit Center in Bellevue; Community Transit's Swift Orange Line bus rapid transit route opened in 2024 and connects the mall to Mill Creek and Edmonds College. The agency also manages an on-demand microtransit service for Alderwood and surrounding parts of Lynnwood. As part of the proposed Everett Link Extension, which would extend Link light rail service from Lynnwood City Center station north to Everett, Sound Transit plans to add a light rail station within the mall's vicinity; it is not expected to open until 2037.

== History ==
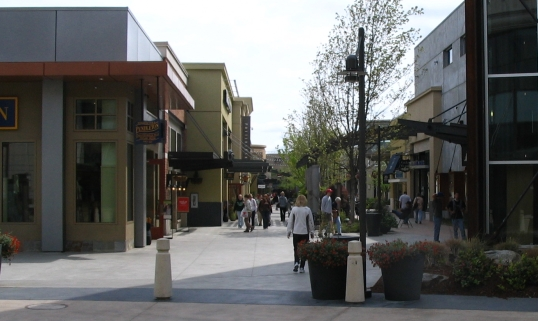
The Village, an outdoor section opened in 2003

Alderwood Mall was opened on October 4, 1979, with an estimated 30,000 people visiting on the first day. It was financed by developer Edward J. DeBartolo Sr. on land originally owned by Allied Stores; the mall's development took a decade from its initial announcement. Its original anchors included The Bon Marché, Lamonts, Nordstrom, JCPenney and Sears. The mall was later sold to the New York State Common Retirement Fund, which retained DeBartolo's management company to operate the center. It remained essentially unchanged except for the addition of a court and cosmetics renovation in 1995-1996 which cost $12 million. After briefly being managed by Simon Property Group following its acquisition of the DeBartolo mall interests in 1996, General Growth Properties assumed management of the property in 1997. General Growth became co-owner of the mall following the formation of a joint venture with the New York pension fund in 1999.

Facing a major vacancy with the 2000 closure of Lamonts, the mall was renovated and expanded in 2002. The former Lamonts store was purchased and razed for the construction of a new Nordstrom that opened in 2003. The former Nordstrom was razed in its turn for the construction of The Village, an attached, open-air lifestyle area on the mall's northern side comprising new shops, restaurants and a Borders. The addition was designed by Callison Architecture and was intended as the first phase in an "urbanized" mall. A second expansion was simultaneously constructed on the mall's southwest side; named The Terraces, it incorporated an expanded food court and restaurants as well as a 16-screen Loews Cineplex Entertainment multiplex. The theater, which opened on March 25, 2005, replaced an older Grand Cinemas theater that Loews operated just outside the mall boundaries. The expansion included two new parking garages, and the theater was constructed over subterranean parking. The 'mall' was dropped from the name at this time and became simply Alderwood, describing itself as a "lifestyle center". Borders closed in 2011 following the company's bankruptcy.

The Bon Marché was briefly renamed Bon-Macy's in 2003, before assuming the Macy's name in 2005. Despite Loews' subsequent merger with AMC Theatres in 2006, the theater retained the Loews name until 2018, when it assumed the AMC moniker.

In November 2005, Daiso, a Japanese dollar-store, opened its first U.S. store in Alderwood next to Sears. Following the success in its original location, Daiso moved to a larger suite adjacent to JCPenney in 2015 before relocating to a strip mall just outside the mall boundaries in 2017. In May 2018, Macy's announced an off price store called Macy's Backstage within its store.

=== Mixed-use redevelopment ===
The mall's then co-owner, General Growth Properties (GGP), filed for Chapter 11 bankruptcy in 2009, though the mall itself was not included in the bankruptcy filing; the company received a $2.5 billion investment from Brookfield Asset Management in exchange for a 30 percent stake as part of its exit from bankruptcy protection the following year. The Sears store at the mall was included in the 2015 spin-off of Sears Holdings properties and joint ventures into Seritage Growth Properties. Sears closed the store in March 2017, with the 178,000-square-foot (16,500 m^{2}) building it occupied torn down in 2019 to make way for redevelopment on the site. In the meantime, Brookfield had fully acquired GGP in 2018 with the intent to transform its mall holdings into mixed-use developments; The Cheesecake Factory opened a location at the mall, the fifth one in Washington state, on August 21 as part of the redevelopment plan. AvalonBay Communities eventually purchased the Sears site from Seritage/Brookfield in January 2020 and subsequently began construction on the Avalon Alderwood Place, a mixed-use development featuring 328 apartments and roughly 64,000 square feet (5,900 m^{2}) of ground-floor retail space. The development had Dave and Buster's and Dick's Sporting Goods as planned retail tenants; the former was slated as a tenant for the neighboring Lynnwood Place mixed-use development before development plans stalled. The apartments first opened in late 2021, with Dave and Buster's opening in August 2022; Dick's was replaced by restaurants Fogo de Chão and Paris Baguette, with the former opening on April 21, 2023, and the latter opening on June 1, 2024. Alongside the development, a freestanding Shake Shack restaurant was opened in September 2023; it was the fourth overall in Washington state and the first with a drive-thru. Upon completion, Brookfield had spent more than $109 million on the redevelopment project; it was one of only two that the company had completed by 2024.

Japanese casual wear retailer Uniqlo opened at Alderwood on May 17, 2024. REI's store in the outdoor section, which opened with the expansion in 2004, closed in March 2025 and was replaced by a larger, off-mall location in Lynnwood the following month.

== In popular culture ==
The mall is referenced in the 1985 song "Searchin' USA", by the Seattle indie rock band The Young Fresh Fellows from their album Topsy Turvy.
