= Mira Mesa Senior High School =

Public high school in San Diego, California, United States

Coordinates: 32°54′39″N 117°08′26″W

Location
- 10510 Marauder Way; San Diego, California 92126; United States

Information
- Type: Public
- Motto: 'We Bleed Blue and Gold'
- Established: 13 September 1976
- School district: San Diego Unified School District
- Principal: Jeff Sabins
- Teaching staff: 84.24 (FTE)
- Grades: 9–12
- Enrollment: 2,228 (2023–2024)
- Student to teacher ratio: 26.45
- Campus: Suburban
- Colors: Blue and gold
- Athletics conference: Eastern League; CIF San Diego Section
- Mascot: Marauder
- Accreditation: Blue Ribbon
- Newspaper: The Marquee
- Yearbook: Mirada
- Website: miramesa.sandiegounified.org

Mira Mesa Senior High School (MMHS) is a public secondary school in San Diego, California. It is part of San Diego Unified School District. The school serves the Mira Mesa community as well as students participating in the district's Voluntary Enrollment Exchange Program (VEEP). It is recognized as a National Blue Ribbon School and a California Distinguished School.

== History ==
Located in the northern portion of the San Diego city limits, Mira Mesa is located in an area once situated by Native American tribes. Due to much of the land being considered wasteland, it was not put to much use for years until the early 1960s. Developers saw its potential to relieve the housing shortage San Diego was facing.

In 1974, a school bond issue was passed to help build the schools that the now full-fledged town of Mira Mesa sorely needed. On September 13, 1976, Mira Mesa Jr./Sr. High School was opened and now serves grades 9-12, fed by the local Challenger and Wangenheim Middle Schools.

Since 1998, Mira Mesa High School has seen an increase in diversity among its students. As of the 2014–15 school year, the student body was composed of around 28% Filipino, 22% Hispanic, and 14% White.

In the spring of 2016 the school was re-accredited for another six years by the Western Association of Schools and Colleges (WASC).

Starting in 2019 major construction projects started on campus, including a new building replacing the bungalow units, and a new music building in the front of the school. This was completed before the 2021 school year, and a second phase of major construction is also expected to be complete by the 2027 school year.

== Athletics ==
Mira Mesa High School's Athletics programs include football, basketball, field hockey, water polo, swimming, baseball, soccer, tennis, cross country, dance, volleyball, badminton, softball, wrestling, lacrosse, and track and field.

== Academics ==
=== SAT ===
In 2019, the average score for the SAT Verbal test was 527. The average for SAT math is 582. The average SAT score overall was 1672, ranking highest in the city of San Diego.

=== College Attendance ===
Mira Mesa High School has a relatively high post-secondary education rate of 92% for the San Diego Unified School District. Most students attend the local University of California, San Diego, or San Diego State University.

== JROTC ==
Mira Mesa High School is home to the 8th Battalion, an Army Junior Reserve Officers' Training Corps unit and one of the fourteen units contained within the San Diego Unified School District JROTC Joint Brigade. It was formerly home to the 936th Wing of Air Force JROTC (CA-936). Established in September 1993, the unit has served Mira Mesa High School and the local community, participating in many community service events such as the annual Mira Mesa Street Fair and Fourth of July Parade.

CA-936 was led by two certified Aerospace Science Instructors consisting of a retired United States Air Force Major and a retired United States Air Force Senior Master Sergeant. As an Army JROTC unit, it is currently led by a retired United States Army Lieutenant Colonel and a retired United States Army Sergeant First Class. Cadet leadership within the unit consists of a thirteen-member "Senior Staff" led by a Battalion Commander. The unit has four drill teams: an Armed Fancy Drill Team, a Color Guard, a Sabre Team, and an Unarmed Fancy Drill Team. The program also boasts several special teams, including a CyberPatriot Team, an Awareness Presentation Team, an Academic Team, and a Raiders Team. In addition to being awarded the Distinguished Unit Award multiple times by AFJROTC Headquarters, CA-936 has twice been awarded the SDUSD Brigade's Stilwell trophy in 2001 and 2002.

== The Witch Creek Fire ==
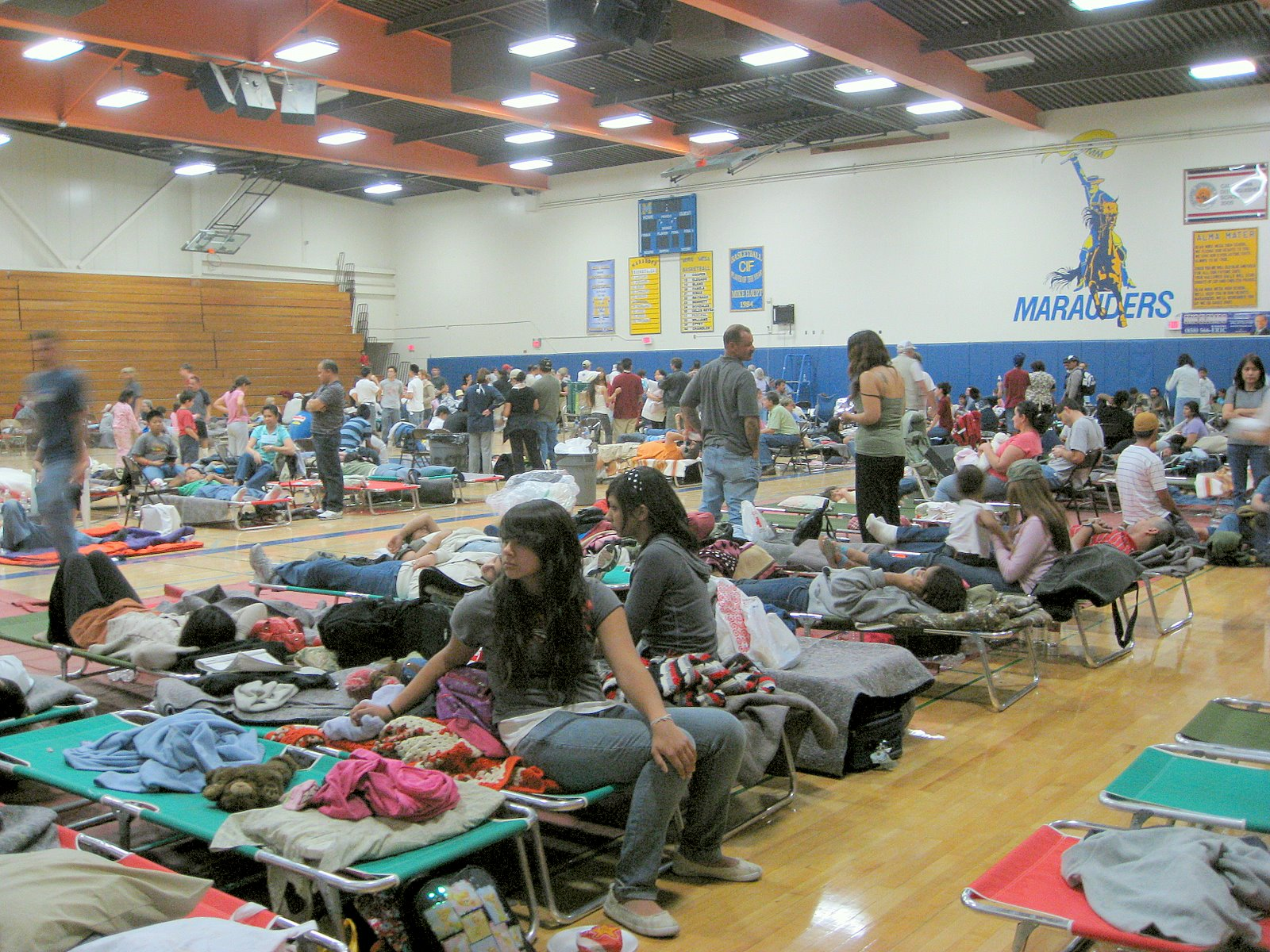
Evacuees at evacuation site

On October 22, 2007, many victims found shelter in the school gym, after they evacuated from the Witch Creek Fire and several other fires threatening San Diego at the time. The fire burned over 20,000 acres (81 km^{2}).

== Notable alumni ==
Name	Grad Class	Category	Best Known For
Chris Chelios	1978	Sports	NHL player, member of Hockey Hall of Fame
Jessica Fischer	1992	Sports	Soccer player
Ray Rowe	1987	Sports	NFL player for Washington Redskins (1992-1993)
Lysley Tenorio	1990	Literature	Short story writer, author of Monstress, and recipient of NEA fellowship, Wallace Stegner fellowship, and Whiting Writers' award
Michael Pittman	1993	Sports	NFL running back for Arizona Cardinals (1998–2001), Tampa Bay Buccaneers (2002–2007), Denver Broncos (2008)
J. R. Tolver	1998	Sports	NFL and CFL player, wide receiver for Los Angeles Avengers (AFL)
Amon Gordon	2000	Sports	Defensive lineman for Philadelphia Eagles
Teyo Johnson	2000	Sports	Pro football player, wide receiver, and fullback for Calgary Stampeders (CFL)
Jake Newberry	2012	Sports	Baseball player
Tyler Thomas	2013	Sports	Baseball player
FaZe Rug	2014	Entertainment	YouTuber and co-owner of FaZe Clan
Damien Williams	2010	Sports	NFL running back for Miami Dolphins (2014-2017) and Kansas City Chiefs (2018–present)

== See also ==
- Primary and secondary schools in San Diego, California
