= Teyo Johnson =

Canadian gridiron football player (born 1981)

No. 82, 84, 85, 86, 2
- Position: Tight end

Personal information
- Born: November 29, 1981 (age 44); White Rock, British Columbia, Canada
- Listed height: 6 ft 7 in (2.01 m)
- Listed weight: 260 lb (118 kg)

Career information
- High school: Mira Mesa (San Diego, California, U.S.)
- College: Stanford
- NFL draft: 2003: 2nd round, 63rd overall pick

Career history
- Oakland Raiders (2003–2004); Arizona Cardinals (2005); Miami Dolphins (2006)*; Denver Broncos (2007)*; → Hamburg Sea Devils (2007); Buffalo Bills (2008)*; Calgary Stampeders (2008–2009); Sacramento Mountain Lions (2010)
- * Offseason or practice squad member only

Awards and highlights
- Grey Cup champion (2008); Pac-10 Co-Freshman of the Year (2001)

Career NFL statistics
- Receptions: 26
- Receiving yards: 288
- Receiving touchdowns: 3
- Stats at Pro Football Reference

Teyo Johnson (born November 29, 1981) is a Canadian former professional football player who was a tight end in the National Football League (NFL) and Canadian Football League (CFL). He was selected by the Oakland Raiders in the second round of the 2003 NFL draft. He played college football with the Stanford Cardinal.

Johnson was also a member of the Arizona Cardinals, Miami Dolphins, Denver Broncos and Buffalo Bills of the NFL, the Hamburg Sea Devils of NFL Europa, the Calgary Stampeders of the CFL, and the Sacramento Mountain Lions of the United Football League.

== Early life ==
Johnson grew up in Lynnwood, Washington and attended Mariner High School in Everett. He transferred to Mira Mesa Senior High School in San Diego, California during his senior year along with friend Amon Gordon, who became an NFL player.

== College career ==
Johnson was recruited to Stanford University as one of the most highly touted two-sport athletes in the country. He aspired to play quarterback, but as he was buried on the depth chart, the coaches switched him to wide receiver to get his talent on the field. In 2001, Johnson was Pac-10 Freshman of the Year at the position of wide receiver. He racked up 79 catches, 1,032 yards and 15 touchdowns in 22 games. After his sophomore season, when the new coach said he was switching Johnson to yet another position from wide receiver to tight end for next season, he decided to leave school early and enter the NFL draft.

He also played forward for two years on the Stanford basketball team, alongside future NBA players like Josh Childress, Casey Jacobsen, Jason Collins and Jarron Collins.

== Professional career ==
=== Oakland Raiders ===
Johnson was selected by the Oakland Raiders in the second round with the 63rd pick of the 2003 NFL draft . In his rookie year he once again changed positions, this time to tight end. He played in all 16 games and made 14 catches for 128 yards and 1 touchdown.

His second season saw him play in only 8 games. He believed that his role was reduced because he missed some voluntary offseason workouts to go to China on an NFL tour, although head coach Norv Turner denied this was the case. Johnson made 9 catches, 131 yards, and 2 touchdowns. He was released by the Raiders on September 3, 2005, at the end of the preseason.

=== Arizona Cardinals ===
He was however quickly signed by the Arizona Cardinals on September 13, 2005. He only played 6 games for the Cardinals before being released on November 22, 2005. He only made 3 catches for 29 yards in those games.

=== Miami Dolphins ===
Johnson signed a reserve/future contract with the Miami Dolphins on January 11, 2006. He was waived on September 2, 2006.

=== Denver Broncos ===
Johnson signed a reserve/future contract with the Denver Broncos on January 1, 2007. He was allocated to NFL Europa in 2007, where he played for the Hamburg Sea Devils during the 2007 NFL Europa season. He played in 10 games, starting four, for the Sea Devils, catching 23 passes for 279 yards and three touchdowns. Johnson was waived/injured by the Broncos on August 28 and reverted to injured reserve the next day. He was waived on August 31, 2007.

=== Buffalo Bills ===
Johnson signed a reserve/future contract with the Buffalo Bills on January 29, 2008. He was released on June 12, 2008.

=== Calgary Stampeders ===
Johnson appeared in 13 games, starting nine, for the Calgary Stampeders of the Canadian Football League in 2008, totaling 15 receptions for 248 yards and two touchdowns. The Stampeders won the 96th Grey Cup that season. He played in 16 games, starting nine, for the Stampeders in 2009, catching 18 passes for 172 yards and two touchdowns.

=== Sacramento Mountain Lions ===
Johnson played in one game, a start, for the Sacramento Mountain Lions of the United Football League in 2010 but recorded no statistics.

== Personal life ==
Johnson is the younger brother of former NFL and CFL players Ahmani Johnson and Riall Johnson.

Early on November 13, 2009, Johnson was stabbed in his rear hip while attending a concert in Calgary.
