= Mariner High School =

Mariner High School can refer to two different schools:

- Mariner High School (Cape Coral, Florida)
- Mariner High School (Everett, Washington)
