= Jazz Moon =

2016 novel by Joe Okonkwo

- Author: Joe Okonkwo
- Language: English
- Genre: Historical fiction, coming-of-age
- Publisher: Kensington Books
- Publication date: May 31, 2016
- Publication place: United States
- Pages: 352
- ISBN: 9781496701169

Jazz Moon is a 2016 historical novel by American writer Joe Okonkwo. Set during the Harlem Renaissance and the Jazz Age, the novel portrays Ben Charles, a young Black gay poet who leaves for Harlem and later Paris in search of meaning.

== Background ==
The novel is set in the 1920s and explores themes of race, sexuality, migration, art, and identity. The narrative moves between rural Georgia, Harlem, and Paris, depicting the experiences of Black artists and queer individuals during the Jazz Age. The novel combines elements of historical fiction, romance, and coming-of-age literature. Jazz Moon was published by Kensington Books in May 2016.

== Reception ==
Kirkus Reviews described the novel as "a story of a young gay poet's journey from the Jim Crow South to Harlem and Paris". Although praised its historical setting, criticised it as a "fairly formulaic love story".

Writing for Lambda Literary Review, Anthony Darden called the novel a "melodic tale that captures the atmosphere of 1920s Harlem and Paris".

== Awards ==
- Edmund White Award for Debut Fiction (2017)
- Finalist of the 29th Lambda Literary Awards for Gay Fiction (2017)
