= Monstress =

Monstress may refer to:

- Monstress (DC Comics), a comics superheroine appearing in Legion of Super-Heroes
- Monstress (comics), a 2015 comics series by Marjorie Liu and Sana Takeda
- Monstress (short story collection), a 2012 collection by Lysley Tenorio
