= For Today I Am a Boy =

2014 novel by Kim Fu

- First edition
- Author: Kim Fu
- Language: English
- Publication date: 2014

For Today I Am a Boy is a novel written by Kim Fu, published in 2014 by HarperCollins. It follows the life of Audrey Huang, a young transgender Chinese child, throughout her childhood and adolescence in Fort Michel, Ontario, and adulthood and transformation in Montreal, Quebec. The novel is named after the Anohni and the Johnsons song of the same title.

== Plot ==
A baby is born to the Chinese Canadian Huangs in Fort Michel, Ontario; assigned male and given the name Peter at birth.

Playing with her three sisters, Adele, Helen, and Bonnie, she understands early on that she is a girl and aspires to embody the femininity her sisters are easily allowed. She struggles in her relationship with her father, a dictatorial, patriarchal man who is committed to eradicating his family's Chinese heritage and shaping her into an "ideal Western man."

At age 18, Huang moves away from home and to Montreal, where she works in restaurants and leads a lonely life. She has affairs with two older women, the first an abusive mother of a casual friend, and the second a Christian evangelist trying to purge herself of lesbianism.

The book ends with her joining her sisters in Germany, and her true name being revealed: Audrey.

== Reception ==
For Today I Am a Boy received several accolades and critical praise. The book was a finalist for the PEN/Hemingway Award and winner of the Edmund White Award. It was also a New York Times Book Review Editors' Choice and was longlisted for Canada Reads. Additionally, it was a finalist for the 2015 Lambda Literary Award for Transgender Fiction.

The Globe and Mail praised Fu's depth of character development for minor characters, writing "Fu’s eye for the tribulations of the jocular bully, Chef, and other supporting characters is perhaps her greatest strength." She also received praise for her care in telling the story of an immigrant family with a transgender child. The National Post writes, "In lesser hands, For Today I Am a Boy could easily veer into the didactic, a catalogue of Valuable Lessons and thinly veiled disdain for old ways of gender, of culture, of family. But it’s not. It’s just that everything is hard for everyone through the entire book, in a way that is somehow not exhausting but fascinating."
