= If You Could Be Mine =

2013 young adult novel by Sara Farizan

If You Could Be Mine: A Novel
- Author: Sara Farizan
- Language: English
- Publisher: Algonquin Young Readers
- Publication date: August 2013
- Publication place: United States
- Pages: 256
- Awards: Lambda Literary Award; Ferro-Grumley Award; Edmund White Award
- ISBN: 978-1-4434-2574-2

If You Could Be Mine is a 2013 young adult novel by Sara Farizan. The book tells the story of Sahar, an Iranian teenage girl who is willing to go through sex reassignment surgery so she can marry her best friend, Nasrin. The book was received positively by critics, especially due to its description of the life of homosexual and transgender people in Iran, and it received multiple awards from LGBT publications in 2014.

== Plot ==
The book is narrated by Sahar, a teenager that lives in Tehran, the capital city of Iran. She grew up in a humble house with her single father and is in a love affair with her childhood friend, Nasrin. Her girlfriend comes from a wealthy family and, although she also loves Sahar, she is afraid to have an open relationship with her, due to the persecution of LGBT people in their country.

Nasrin was arranged to be married to a man, and she is unwilling to call it off so as not to disappoint her family. While Nasrin is content to have her as a lover, Sahar becomes desperate. Through her gay cousin, Ali, she meets Parveen, a transgender woman, and decides she will go through sex reassignment surgery so Nasrin will accept marrying her.

== Background ==
Sara Farizan began writing about LGBT themes for young adults while in graduate school, at Lesley University. In an interview with NPR, she said that part of the reason she decided to write about these themes was to explore the experience Iranian youth can go through in a country where homosexuality is banned. Farizan, who is Iranian-American and gay, said she spent several years closeted due to her parents being from Iran and fearing it wasn't safe to talk to others about her same-sex attraction.

== Reception ==
If You Could Be Mine was well received by critics. Kirkus Reviews called it "[a] moving and elegant story of first love and family". They also noted how the books goes to great lengths to show a diverse cast of transgender characters, and never says that transitioning is a mistake. Karen Coats praised the author's tackling of some topical issues, but disliked how Farizan "ends up telling more than showing her story", due to the main character's "purposive conversations about social issues, surgical procedures, and her options". Coats ends on a positive note, though, as she found the book's take on how gender dysphoria and homosexuality are treated in the country to be thought-provoking.

Michael Cart, for The Booklist, praised the book's "powerful depiction of gay and transexual life in Iran", as well as how it differs from the views in the West. Heather Booth, in her review, highlighted Farizan's usage of different speech patterns to help delineate the personality of each character, and called it a "moving presentation of a powerful story". Reviewing for the New York Times, Jessica Bruder found the author's prose to be "frank, funny and bittersweet", and also praised the secondary plots, calling them memorable.

In 2014, If You Could Be Mine received the Ferro-Grumley and Edmund White Award by the Publishing Triangle, marking the first time a novel won the first prize in two different categories in the same year. The book also won the Lambda Literary Award for Children's and Young Adult Literature in 2014.
