= Katharine Beutner =

American novelist

- Born: Lancaster, Pennsylvania, U.S.
- Education: Smith College (BA in classical studies); University of Texas (PhD in English)
- Occupations: Novelist, academic
- Known for: Feminist writings
- Website: katharinebeutner.com

Katharine Beutner is an American novelist, essayist, and academic. She is the author of Alcestis, winner of the Edmund White Award from the Publishing Triangle in 2011. From 2013 to 2017 she was an assistant professor of English at the University of Hawaiʻi at Mānoa. From 2017 to 2019, she was a visiting assistant professor and from 2019 to 2023, she was an assistant professor of English at the College of Wooster. Since 2023, she has been an associate professor of English at University of Wisconsin–Milwaukee.

== Personal life ==
Beutner is bisexual.

== Awards ==
Year	Book	Award	Category	Result	Ref
2011	Alcestis	Compton Crook Award	—	Shortlisted	
2011	Alcestis	Edmund White Award	—	Won	
2011	Alcestis	Lambda Literary Award	Lesbian Debut Fiction	Shortlisted	

== Published works ==
=== Novels ===
- Alcestis (Soho Press, 2010)
- Killingly (Soho Press, 2023)

=== Journals ===
- Some Little Lamb (an excerpt from the novel Killingly) (TriQuarterly, 2013)

=== Academic publications ===
- Remixing the Outline: a Middle-State Moment of Revision. Rough Cuts: Media and Design in Process. Curated by Kari Kraus. Digital collection on MediaCommons' The New Everyday.
- 'The Sole Business of Ladies in Romances': Sharing Histories in Charlotte Lennox's The Female Quixote. Masters of the Marketplace: British Women Novelists of the 1750s. Ed. Susan Carlile. Bethlehem: Lehigh University Press, May 2011. 165-181.
- Review of A Political Biography of Delarivier Manley, Rachel Carnell. Women's Writing 17.1 (April 2010): 196-198.
