= Amon Gordon =

American football player (born 1981)

No. 94, 63, 76, 99, 96, 97
- Position: Defensive end

Personal information
- Born: October 13, 1981 (age 45); Queens, New York, U.S.
- Listed height: 6 ft 2 in (1.88 m)
- Listed weight: 305 lb (138 kg)

Career information
- High school: Mira Mesa (San Diego, California)
- College: Stanford
- NFL draft: 2004: 5th round, 161st overall pick

Career history
- Cleveland Browns (2004–2005); Denver Broncos (2006–2007); Baltimore Ravens (2007); Tennessee Titans (2008); Philadelphia Eagles (2009)*; New England Patriots (2010)*; Seattle Seahawks (2010)*; Tennessee Titans (2010); Houston Texans (2010)*; Seattle Seahawks (2010); Kansas City Chiefs (2011)
- * Offseason or practice squad member only

Career NFL statistics
- Total tackles: 56
- Sacks: 2
- Forced fumbles: 1
- Stats at Pro Football Reference

Amon Gordon (born October 13, 1981) is an American former professional football player who was a defensive end in the National Football League (NFL). He was selected by the Cleveland Browns in the fourth round of the 2004 NFL draft. He played college football for the Stanford Cardinal.

Gordon was also a member of the Denver Broncos, Baltimore Ravens, Tennessee Titans, Philadelphia Eagles, New England Patriots, Seattle Seahawks, Houston Texans and Kansas City Chiefs.

== Early life ==
Gordon attended Oak Harbor High School in Washington state, where he was the only Freshman on the varsity football and basketball teams. After his freshman year, Gordon transferred to Mariner High School, in Everett, Washington and played football there as a sophomore and junior. As a senior, he transferred to Mira Mesa Senior High School in San Diego, California, where he played running back and defense. He was named first-team all-state and league offensive MVP.

== College career ==
Gordon played college football at Stanford University, where he redshirted in his freshman season in 2000. As a redshirt freshman in 2001, Gordon played defensive end and inside linebacker. In 2002, as a starter, Gordon had four sacks and two fumble recoveries. Gordon moved to defensive tackle for his final season in 2003, and finished his college career with 35 games (18 starts), 71 tackles, and seven sacks.

== Professional career ==
=== Cleveland Browns ===
Gordon was selected by the Cleveland Browns in the fourth round (161st overall) in the 2004 NFL draft. In his rookie season, he played in six games and posted ten tackles. His second season with the Browns was ended by a knee injury that ruled him out for the entire year.

=== Denver Broncos ===
Gordon was signed by the Denver Broncos to their practice squad on March 22, 2006, after being waived by the Browns. He played in all four preseason games before being waived on September 2, 2006. He was re-signed to the team's practice squad the next day, where he spent the entire season. Gordon made the Broncos' 53-man roster in 2007, and played in four games, recording 13 tackles, before being waived on November 6, 2007.

=== Baltimore Ravens ===
Gordon was signed to the practice squad of the Baltimore Ravens on November 21, 2007. He was promoted to the Ravens' 53-man roster on December 9 and played in one of the Ravens' final four games, recording three tackles. He was not tendered as a restricted free agent following the season but was re-signed in March 2008 and released on August 29, 2008.

=== Tennessee Titans (first stint) ===
Gordon was signed to the Titans practice squad on November 5, 2008. He was activated from the practice squad on December 20, 2008. Gordon recorded six tackles in the final two games for the Titans. He was waived on January 6, 2009, during the playoffs.

=== Philadelphia Eagles ===
On January 21, 2009, Gordon was signed to a future deal by the Philadelphia Eagles. He was placed on injured reserve on June 11 with a torn Achilles tendon and was released with an injury settlement on August 11.

=== New England Patriots ===
Gordon signed with the New England Patriots on April 21, 2010. On June 10, 2010, the Patriots released Gordon.

=== Seattle Seahawks (first stint) ===
Gordan signed with the Seattle Seahawks on August 18, 2010. He was released on September 4, 2010.

=== Tennessee Titans (second stint) ===
The Titans re-signed Gordon on October 5, 2010. He was released again on November 9, 2010.

=== Houston Texans ===
Gordon was signed to the practice squad of the Houston Texans on November 17, 2010. He was released three days later.

=== Seattle Seahawks (second stint) ===
The Seahawks re-signed Gordon on November 23, 2010.

=== Kansas City Chiefs ===
After his contract with Seattle expired, Gordon signed with the Kansas City Chiefs on August 6, 2011. Gordon had his first sack as a Chief, during the Chiefs/Patriots game. The Chiefs would go on to lose that game 34–3. The next week, Gordon had his second sack against the Steelers. The Chiefs would lose the game 13–9. Gordon finished the season with two sacks and 23 tackles. In 2012, Gordon was released in the last rounds of roster cuts with the Chiefs.

== Personal life ==
He resides in Oakland, California.

He has dementia and is not able to work.
