= Joe Okonkwo =

American writer

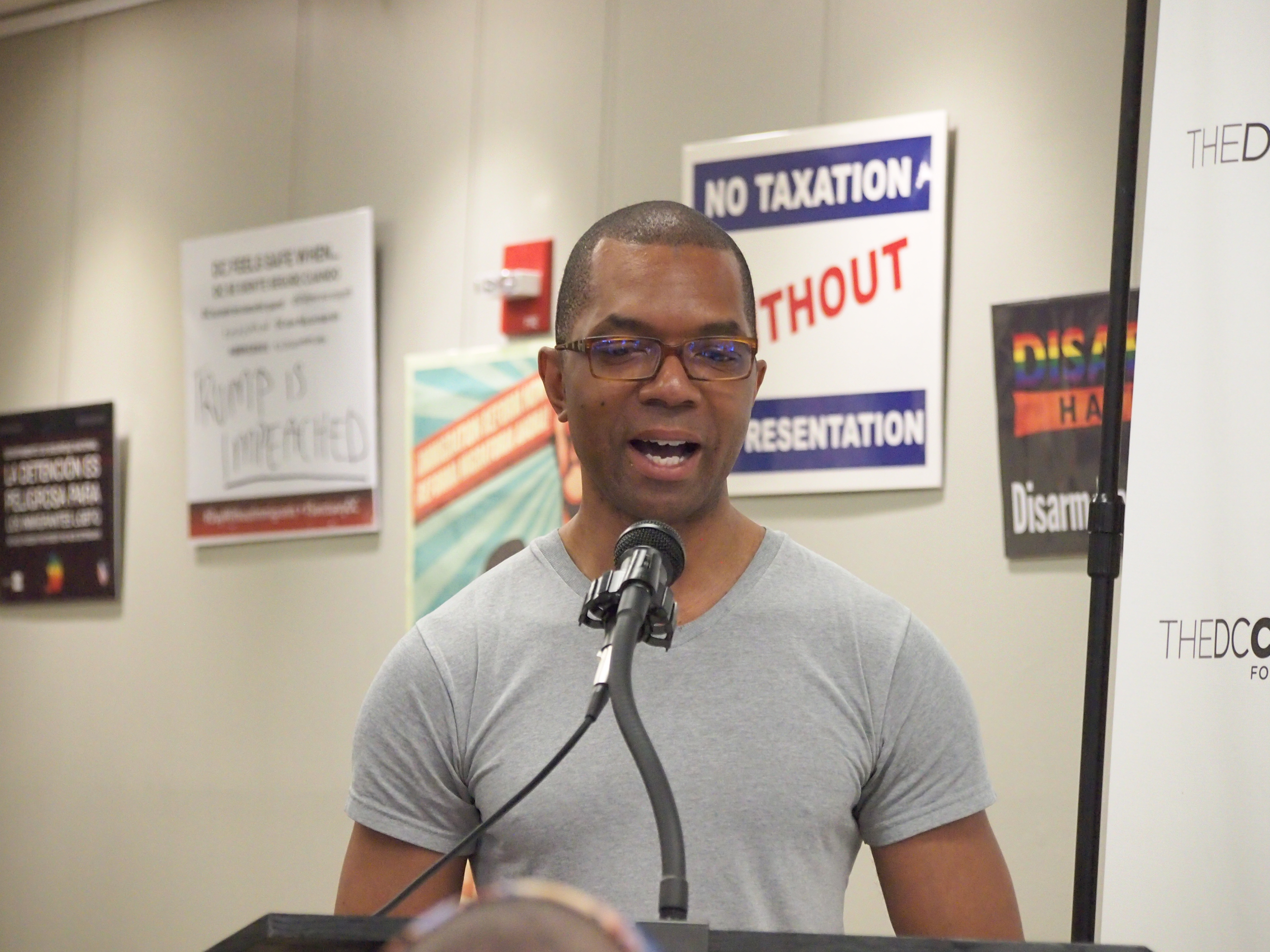
- Okonkwo reading at Outwrite2017
- Education: University of Houston (BA); City College of New York (MFA)
- Occupation: Writer
- Writing career
- Notable awards: Edmund White Award (2017)
- Website: www.joeokonkwo.com

Joe Okonkwo is an American writer of Nigerian descent, whose debut novel Jazz Moon won the Edmund White Award and was shortlisted for the Lambda Literary Award for Gay Fiction, in 2017.

== Early life and education ==
He earned a BA in theater from the University of Houston and an MFA in creative writing from the City College of New York.

Originally from Syracuse, New York, he has been based in New York City since 2000.

== Career ==
Okonkwo's short stories have appeared in The Piltdown Review, The New Engagement, Storychord, Penumbra, Promethean, and Shotgun Honey. His work has been anthologized in Love Stories from Africa, Best Gay Love Stories 2009, Best Gay Stories 2015 and Strength. His short story "Cleo" was nominated for a Pushcart Prize. He served as Prose Editor for Newtown Literary, a journal dedicated to publishing and nurturing writers from Queens, New York. He edited Best Gay Stories 2017. Okonkwo has led creative writing classes at Gotham Writers' Workshop, Newtown Literary/Queens Library, and the Bronx Arts Council. He served on the planning committee for the Provincetown Book Festival.

Joe Okonkwo's writing shines a spotlight on complex characters, both male and female, navigating the intersection of Black and gay identities. His work vividly portrays the challenges they encounter and the sacrifices they make in their pursuit of authenticity and self-expression.

== Works ==
In 2016, he published his debut novel, Jazz Moon, chronicling self-discovery during the height of the Jazz Age. Okonkwo's story collection, Kiss the Scars on the Back of my Neck, was published by Amble Press on October 10, 2021.
