= Ani Kayode Somtochukwu =

Nigerian novelist

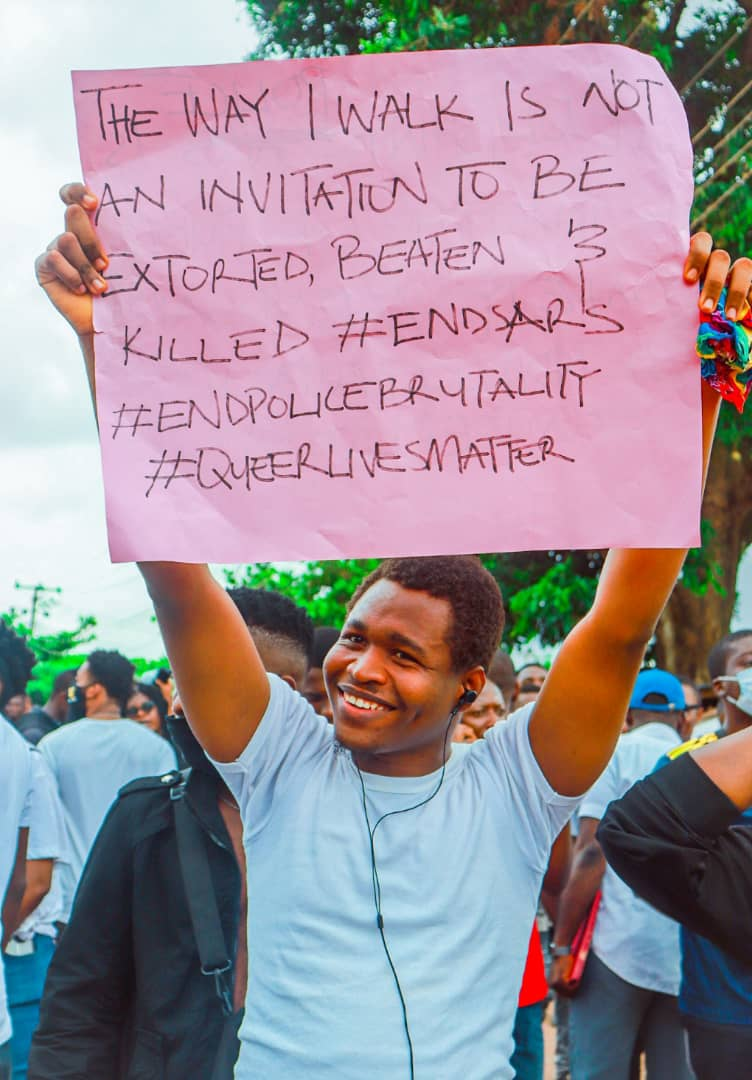
- Ani Kayode Somtochukwu during the EndSARS, 2020
- Born: 1999 or 2000 (age 26–27)
- Education: Enugu State University of Science and Technology (ESUT)
- Occupation: Writer
- Known for: And Then He Sang a Lullaby (2023)
- Awards: Edmund White Award (2024)

Ani Kayode Somtochukwu (born 1999 or 2000) is a Nigerian novelist, known for his 2023 debut novel, And Then He Sang a Lullaby, which won the Edmund White Award in 2024.

== Early life and education ==
Ani attended Command Children's School Awkunanaw in Enugu before proceeding to Union Secondary School. Following his primary and secondary education, he enrolled at Enugu State University of Science and Technology shortly after the Same Sex Marriage (Prohibition) Act was signed into law in Nigeria, from where he graduated with an Honours degree in Applied Biology and Biotechnology.

== Personal life ==
He has been active as a writer since 2015. Ani has spoken about experiencing bullying from an early age because he was perceived as effeminate. He identifies as queer.

== Career ==
Ani began writing his debut novel, And Then He Sang a Lullaby, in 2018 and published it in 2023. Describing the novel, Grove Atlantic called it "searing and resonant," noting its exploration of the costs of love and freedom in a homophobic society. According to Ani, he first drafted the novel in a notebook before typing it on his phone, as the cost of having it typed by a professional was prohibitive.

Before its publication, Ani's debut novel won the inaugural James Currey Prize in 2021. The prize was established by Onyeka Nwelue. His writings have appeared in literary magazines and anthologies across Africa, Europe, Asia and North America.

== Advocacy ==
He founded the Queer Union for Economic and Social Transformation (QUEST). In 2022, he led what has been described as the first openly LGBTQ+ protest in Abuja. The protest was organized in response to a proposed bill that sought to ban cross-dressing in Nigeria. Ani in an interview with The Pink News expressed concerns about the potential consequences of the legislation, arguing that its passage could endanger gender-nonconforming and LGBTQ+ people.

He believes that queer liberation is the only sustainable solution to the unhappiness of queer people.

== Awards and honours ==
- 2020 Nigeria Prize for Difference and Diversity
- 2021 James Currey Prize for African Literature - WON
- Summer/Fall 2023 Indies Introduce selection
- 2023 Association of Nigerian Authors (ANA) Prose Prize - SHORTLIST
- 2023 NAACP Image Awards for Outstanding Debut Fiction - NOMINEE
- 2023 INDIES Book of the Year Award (Literary Fiction)
- 2023 Brittle Paper: The Notable African Books of the Year
- 2024 Edmund White Award for debut fiction - WON

== Bibliography ==
=== Novels ===
—— (2023). And Then He Sang A Lullaby (1st ed.). Roxane Gay Book. ISBN 9781804710180.

=== Essays ===
- "The un-African mechanisms of queer repression". africasacountry.com.
- "To Divine, from Grindr". Off Assignment. 2024-03-19.
