= SJ Sindu =

American novelist

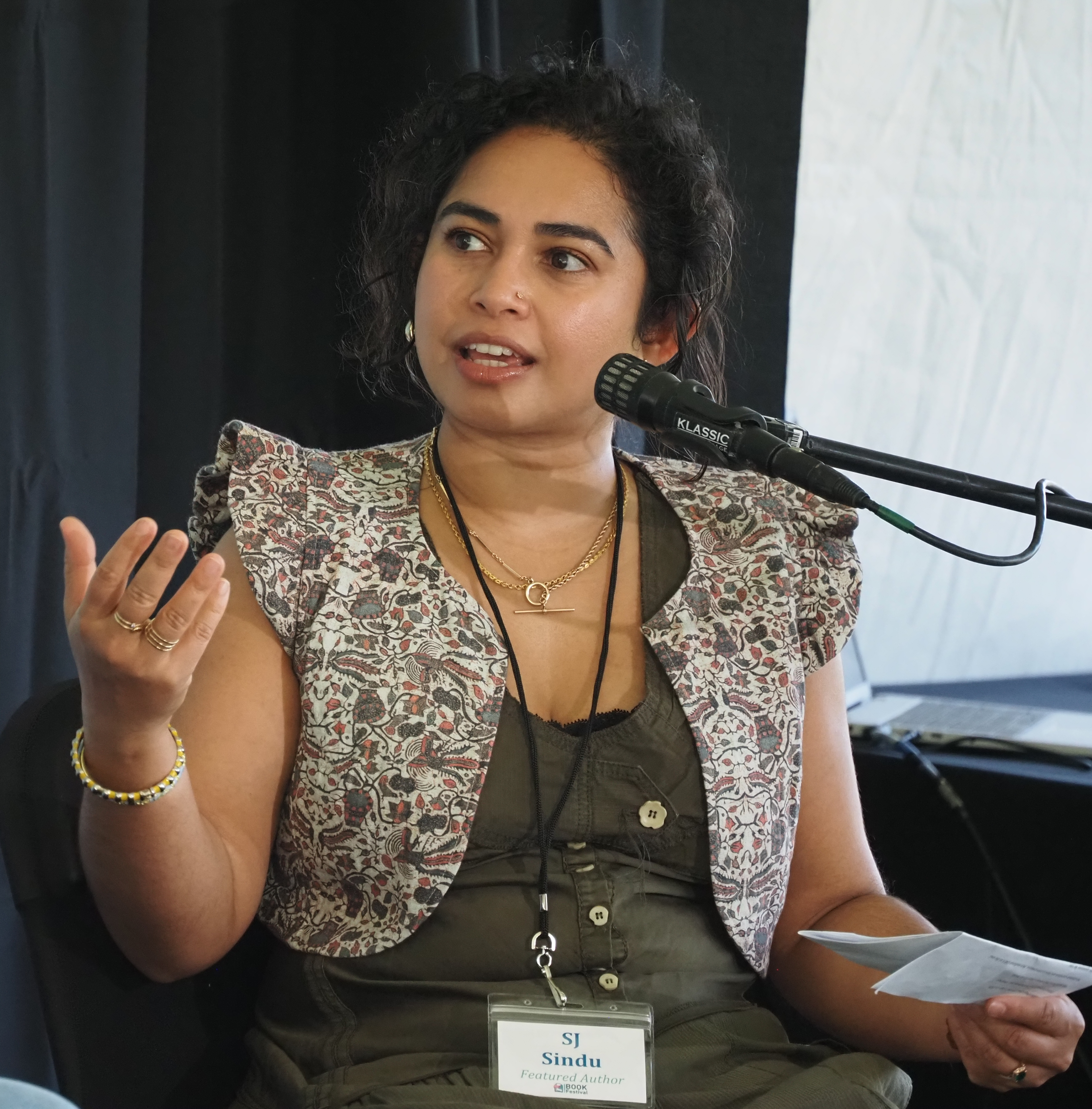
- at the 2026 Gaithersburg Book Festival
- Born: Trincomalee, Sri Lanka
- Education: University of Nebraska–Lincoln; Florida State University
- Occupation: Novelist
- Spouse: Geoff Bouvier
- Website: sjsindu.com

SJ Sindu is a genderqueer Sri Lankan American novelist and short story writer.

== Career ==
Her first novel, Marriage of a Thousand Lies, was released by Soho Press in June 2017, won the Publishing Triangle Edmund White Award for Debut Fiction, and was named an American Library Association Stonewall Honor Book. Her second novel, Blue-Skinned Gods, was released on November 17, 2021, also by Soho Press. Her second chapbook Dominant Genes, which won the 2020 Black River Chapbook Competition, was released in February 2022 by Black Lawrence Press. Her middle-grade fantasy graphic novel, Shakti, was published in 2023 by HarperCollins. Her work has been published in Brevity, The Normal School, The Los Angeles Review of Books, apt, Vinyl Poetry, PRISM International, VIDA, Black Girl Dangerous, rkvry quarterly, and elsewhere. Sindu was a 2013 Lambda Literary Fellow, holds an MA from the University of Nebraska–Lincoln, and a PhD in Creative Writing from Florida State University. She currently teaches Creative Writing at Virginia Commonwealth University.

== Bibliography ==
=== Novels ===
- Marriage of a Thousand Lies. New York: Soho Press, 2017, ISBN 9781616957902
- Blue-Skinned Gods. New York: Soho Press, Nov 02, 2021, ISBN 9781641292429

=== Short Story Collections ===
- The Goth House Experiment. New York: Soho Press, 2023, ISBN 9781641295192

=== Graphic Novels ===
- Shakti. New York: HarperCollins, 2023, ISBN 9780063090132
- Tall Water. New York: HarperCollins, 2025, ISBN 9780063090156

=== Chapbooks ===
- I Once Met You But You Were Dead. Philadelphia: Split Lip Press, 2017
- Dominant Genes. New York: Black Lawrence Press, 2022

== Awards ==
- Publishing Triangle Edmund White Award for Debut Fiction for Marriage of a Thousand Lies
- American Library Association Stonewall Honor Book for Marriage of a Thousand Lies
- Lambda Literary Award Finalist for Marriage of a Thousand Lies
- Independent Publisher Book Awards Silver Medal for Marriage of a Thousand Lies
- Split Lip Turnbuckle Chapbook Contest award winner for I Once Met You But You Were Dead
- Winner of the Fall 2020 Black River Chapbook Competition for Dominant Genes
- The Story Prize Spotlight Award for The Goth House Experiment
