= Evan Fallenberg =

American writer (born 1961)

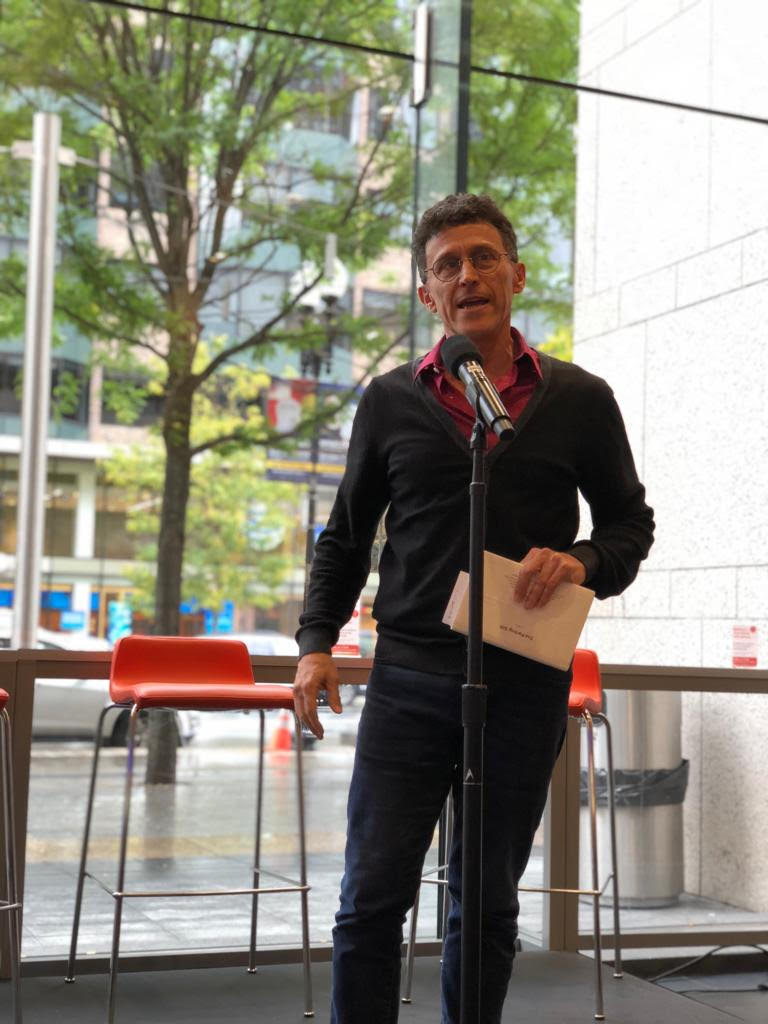
At the Boston Public Library, 2018

Evan Fallenberg (born August 8, 1961) is an American-born writer and translator residing in Israel. His debut novel Light Fell, published in 2008, won the Stonewall Book Award and the Edmund White Award, and was a shortlisted Lambda Literary Award nominee for Debut Fiction at the 21st Lambda Literary Awards. His second novel, When We Danced on Water, was published in 2011 by HarperPerennial, and his third, The Parting Gift, by Other Press in 2018. He has also published English translations of several Israeli writers, including Meir Shalev, Hanoch Levin, Ron Leshem and Batya Gur.

== Life ==
Originally from Cleveland, Ohio, holds a BSFS in diplomacy from the School of Foreign Service at Georgetown University. He also studied in Switzerland, worked in Japan and settled in Israel in 1985. He also has an MFA in creative writing from Vermont College of Fine Arts.

He currently teaches creative writing and literary translation at Bar-Ilan University in Ramat Gan, Israel, and is faculty co-director of the International low-residency MFA program in Creative Writing & Literary Translation at Vermont College of Fine Arts.

Fallenberg renovated an ancient home in Acre as a writer's retreat and opened Arabesque, an Arts and Residency Center in the heart of Old Acre, Israel, in 2016. Arabesque was destroyed in the May 2021 riots but was restored, and opened again to the public several months later.

Fallenberg has served as a judge or advisor to a number of literary prizes, including the Sami Rohr Prize and the Galtelli Literary Awards. He has received fellowships for residencies from the MacDowell Colony, the National Endowment for the Arts (at Vermont Studio Center), Fondation Ledig-Rowohlt (at Chateau de Lavigny, Switzerland), Banff Centre for the Arts (Canada), Hannesarholt and Gunnarshus in Iceland, Sun Yat-sen University of China, and the Bogliasco Foundation (Italy), and has taken part in conferences and festivals around the globe.

== Publications ==
=== Novels ===
- Light Fell, New York: Soho, 2008. ISBN 9781569475362, OCLC 216936811
- When We Danced on Water, New York: Harper Perennial, 2011. ISBN 9780062033321, OCLC 670476288
- The Parting Gift, New York: Other Press, 2018. ISBN 9781590519431, OCLC 1016377533

== Awards and honors ==
- 2007: National Jewish Book Award for fiction
- 2008: Finalist, Lambda Literary Award for Gay Debut Fiction
- 2009: American Library Association's Barbara Gittings Stonewall Book Award for Literature
- 2009: Edmund White Award for Debut Fiction
