= Edmund White Award =

Literary award for LGBT authors' debut novels

- Awarded for: Debut novel by LGBTQ+ writers
- Sponsored by: Publishing Triangle
- Reward: US$1,000
- Established: 2006
- Website: http://www.publishingtriangle.org

The Edmund White Award is an annual literary award, presented by Publishing Triangle to honor debut novels by writers within the LGBTQ+ community. First presented in 2006, the award was named in honor of American novelist Edmund White.

== Recipients ==
Award winners and finalists
Year	Author	Title	Publisher	Result	Ref.
2006	Mack Friedman	Setting the Lawn on Fire	University of Wisconsin Press	Winner	
2006	Charlie Jane Anders	Choir Boys	Soft Skull Press	Finalist	
2006	Katia Noyes	Crashing America	Alyson Books	Finalist	
2007	Martin Hyatt	A Scarecrow's Bible	Suspect Thoughts Press	Winner	
2007	Alex McLennan	The Zookeeper	Alyson Books	Finalist	
2007	Eduardo Santiago	Tomorrow They Will Kiss	Little, Brown	Finalist	
2008	Myriam Gurba	Dahlia Season	Manic C Press	Winner	
2008	Bob Smith	Selfish and Perverse	Carroll & Graf	Finalist	
2008	James Cañón	Tales from the Town of Widows	HarperCollins	Finalist	
2009	Evan Fallenberg	Light Fell	Soho Press	Winner	
2009	Alistair McCartney	The End of the World Book	University of Wisconsin Press	Finalist	
2009	Shawn Stewart Ruff	Finlater	Quote Editions	Finalist	
2010	Lori Ostlund	The Bigness of the World	University of Georgia Press	Winner	
2010	Elise Moser	Because I Have Loved and Hidden It	Cormorant Books	Finalist	
2010	Rakesh Satyal	Blue Boy	Kensington	Finalist	
2011	Katharine Beutner	Alcestis	Soho Press	Winner	
2011	Catherine Kirkwood	Cut Away	Arktoi Books	Finalist	
2011	Michael Alenyikov	Ivan and Misha	Triquarterly/Northwestern University Press	Finalist	
2012	Lara Fergus	My Sister Chaos	Spinifex Press	Winner	
2012	Garth Greenwell	Mitko	Miami University Press	Finalist	
2012	Justin Torres	We the Animals	Houghton Mifflin Harcourt	Finalist	
2012	Laurie Weeks	Zipper Mouth	The Feminist Press	Finalist	
2013	Lysley Tenorio	Monstress	Ecco/HarperCollins	Winner	
2013	Carter Sickels	The Evening Hour	Bloomsbury	Finalist	
2013	E. J. Levy	Love, in Theory	University of Georgia Press	Finalist	
2013	Monica Trasandes	Broken Like This	Thomas Dunne Books/St. Martin's	Finalist	
2014	Sara Farizan	If You Could Be Mine (Note: If You Could Be Mine also won the Ferro-Grumley Award for LGBT Fiction.)	Algonquin Young Readers	Winner	
2014	Derek Palacio	How to Shake the Other Man	Nouvella	Finalist	
2014	Rick Whitaker	An Honest Ghost	Jaded Ibis Press	Finalist	
2014	Sandra Moran	Letters Never Sent	Bedazzled Ink	Finalist	
2015	Kim Fu	For Today I Am a Boy	Houghton Mifflin Harcourt	Winner	
2015	Alden Jones	Unaccompanied Minors	New American Press	Finalist	
2015	Michael Carroll	Little Reef and Other Stories	University of Wisconsin Press	Finalist	
2015	Shelly Oria	New York 1, Tel Aviv 0	Farrar, Straus and Giroux	Finalist	
2016	Carellin Brooks	One Hundred Days of Rain	BookThug	Winner	
2016	Ioannis Pappos	Hotel Living	HarperPerennial/HarperCollins	Finalist	
2016	Mecca Jamilah Sullivan	Blue Talk and Love	Riverdale Avenue Books	Finalist	
2016	Tanwi Nandini Islam	Bright Lines	Penguin Books	Finalist	
2017	Joe Okonkwo	Jazz Moon	Kensington	Winner	
2017	Kathy Anderson	Bull and Other Stories	Autumn House Press	Finalist	
2017	Matthew Griffin	Hide	Bloomsbury USA	Finalist	
2017	R. J. Hernández	An Innocent Fashion	HarperPerennial/HarperCollins	Finalist	
2018	S. J. Sindu	Marriage of a Thousand Lies	Soho Press	Winner	
2018	Carmen Maria Machado	Her Body and Other Parties	Graywolf Press	Finalist	
2018	Catherine Hernandez	Scarborough	Arsenal Pulp Press	Finalist	
2018	Fiona Mozley	Elmet	Algonquin Books	Finalist	
2019	Joseph Cassara	The House of Impossible Beauties	Ecco/HarperCollins	Winner	
2019	Akwaeke Emezi	Freshwater	Grove Press	Finalist	
2019	Ana Simo	Heartland	Restless Books	Finalist	
2019	Dan Callahan	That Was Something	Squares and Rebels	Finalist	
2020	Téa Mutonji	Shut Up You're Pretty	Arsenal Pulp Press	Winner	
2020	Bryan Washington	Lot	Riverhead	Finalist	
2020	De'Shawn Charles Winslow	In West Mills	Bloomsbury	Finalist	
2020	Kimberly King Parsons	Black Light	Vintage	Finalist	
2021	Julia Serano	99 Erics: A Kat Cataclysm Faux Novel	Switch Hitter Press	Winner	
2021	Brandon Taylor	Real Life	Riverhead	Finalist	
2021	Eddy Boudel Tan	After Elias	Dundurn Press	Finalist	
2021	Sophie Yanow	The Contradictions	Drawn and Quarterly	Finalist	
2022	Robert Jones Jr.	The Prophets	G.P. Putnam's Sons	Winner	
2022	Callum Angus	A Natural History of Transition	Metonymy Press	Finalist	
2022	Claire Cox	Silver Beach	University of Massachusetts Press	Finalist	
2022	Nawaaz Ahmed	Radiant Fugitives	Counterpoint Press	Finalist	
2023	Estela Gonzalez	Arribada	Cynren Press	Winner	
2023	Alyssa Songsiridej	Little Rabbit	Bloomsbury US	Finalist	
2023	David Santos Donaldson	Greenland	Amistad/HarperCollins	Finalist	
2023	Eloghosa Osunde	Vagabonds!	Riverhead Books/Penguin	Finalist	
2023	Morgan Thomas	Manywhere	MCD Books/Farrar, Straus Giroux	Finalist	
2024	Ani Kayode Somtochukwu	And Then He Sang a Lullaby	Grove Atlantic	Winner	
2024	Selby Wynn Schwartz	After Sappho	Liveright	Finalist	
2024	C. E. McGill	Our Hideous Progeny	HarperCollins	Finalist	
2024	Chloe Chun Seim	Churn: A Novel in Stories	Texas Review Press: The University Press of Sam Houston State University	Finalist	
2025	Jiaming Tang	Cinema Love	Dutton	Winner	
2025	Elliott Gish	Grey Dog	ECW Press	Finalist	
2025	Muriel Leung	How to Fall in Love in a Time of Unnameable Disaster	W. W. Norton & Company	Finalist	
2025	Asha Thanki	A Thousand Times Before	Viking	Finalist	
2026	Stephanie Wambugu	Lonely Crowds	Little, Brown and Company	Winner	
2026	Iryn Tushabe	Everything Is Fine Here	House of Anansi Press	Finalist	
2026	Aria Aber	Good Girl	Hogarth	Finalist	
2026	Eliana Ramage	To the Moon and Back	Simon & Schuster / Avid Reader Press	Finalist	
2026	Emily St. James	Woodworking	Zando – Crooked Media Reads	Finalist	
