= Geoff Bouvier =

American poet

- Born: Los Angeles, California
- Occupation: poet
- Spouse: SJ Sindu

Geoff Bouvier is an American prose poet. His newest book, Us From Nothing was published by Wolsak & Wynn in Canada in 2023, and by Black Lawrence Press in the US in 2024. Us From Nothing is a book-length serial epic prose poem about the most important milestones in human history from the big bang to the near future.

His first book, Living Room, was selected by Heather McHugh as the winner of the 2005 The American Poetry Review Honickman Prize. His second book, Glass Harmonica, was published in 2011 by Quale Press. Recent writings have appeared in American Poetry Review, Barrow Street, Denver Quarterly, jubilat, New American Writing, Western Humanities Review, and VOLT. He received an MFA from Bard College's Milton Avery Graduate School of the Arts in 1997, and a PhD in Poetry at Florida State University in 2016. In 2009, he was the Roberta C. Holloway visiting poet at the University of California-Berkeley. He teaches creative writing at Virginia Commonwealth University.

== Bibliography ==
=== Poetry collections ===
- Living Room. Philadelphia: Copper Canyon Press, 2005, ISBN 9780971898189
- Glass Harmonica. Quale Press, 2011 ISBN 9781935835035
- Us From Nothing. Wolsak & Wynn, 2023 ISBN 978-1-989496-72-5
