= Gina Segadelli =

American soccer player (born 1966)

Personal information
- Full name: Gina Segadelli
- Birth name: Gina Cassella
- Date of birth: April 19, 1966 (age 60)
- Place of birth: Torrance, California, United States
- Height: 5 ft 4 in (1.63 m)
- Position: Forward

Youth career
- –1984: Mariner Marauders

College career
Years	Team	Apps	(Gls)
1984	UC Santa Barbara Gauchos	13	(12)

International career
1992	United States	2	(1)

Managerial career
- Bothell Cougars
- Bothell Cougars Boys JV
- Bothell Cougars Boys
- 1994–1996: Seattle Sounders Men (assistant)

Gina Segadelli (née Cassella; born April 19, 1966) is an American former soccer player who played as a forward, making two appearances for the United States women's national team.

== Early life and education ==
Segadelli played for the Mariner Marauders in high school, where she was a two-time All-American. She also played basketball, softball, and track and field.

Segadelli attended the University of California, Santa Barbara and began in Fall 1984. While a student, she played 13 games for the UC Santa Barbara Gauchos soccer team, where she scored twelve goals and registered ten assists in 1984. However, she suffered a major knee injury against Westmont College in October 1984 that would ultimately end her collegiate career. Despite an initial recovery, she re-injured her knee in Spring 1985 which ruled her out of a soccer tour of China that summer. She opted to leave Santa Barbara afterwards.

== National team career ==
Segadelli made her international debut for the United States on August 14, 1992, in the New England Sports Museum Challenge Cup (a friendly tournament) against Norway. She earned her second and final cap two days later against the same opponent, scoring in the 2–4 loss.

== Coaching career ==
In 1994, she joined the Seattle Sounders men's soccer team of the APSL as an assistant coach, becoming the first woman to coach a men's professional soccer team in the U.S. In 2016, she was included in the All-Time Women's Roster by Washington Youth Soccer.

== Personal life ==
Gina Segadelli was born in Torrance, California on April 19, 1966. She moved to Mukilteo in 1976, where she attended school. She graduated from Mariner High School in 1984. After graduation, Segadelli attended UC Santa Barbara on a soccer scholarship. Segadelli transferred to the University of Washington after her college soccer career was ended by a knee injury her freshman year. After graduating, Segadelli attended Graduate School at Western Washington University, where she earned her Masters in Education. She later worked as an English teacher for ten years at Bothell High School and Woodinville High School, coaching the girls and boys soccer teams at Bothell in the 1990s, before working in sales management in the tech industry. Segadelli resides in Woodinville, Washington, with her husband Steve, and daughter Adriana (Adie). She also has two step-children, Jennifer and Patrick Segadelli, and three step-grandchildren.

== Career statistics ==
=== International ===
United States
Year	Apps	Goals
1992	2	1
Total	2	1

=== International goals ===
No.	Date	Location	Opponent	Score	Result	Competition
1	August 16, 1992	New Britain, Connecticut, United States	Norway	2–2	2–4	New England Sports Museum Challenge Cup
