= Kim Fu =

Canadian writer

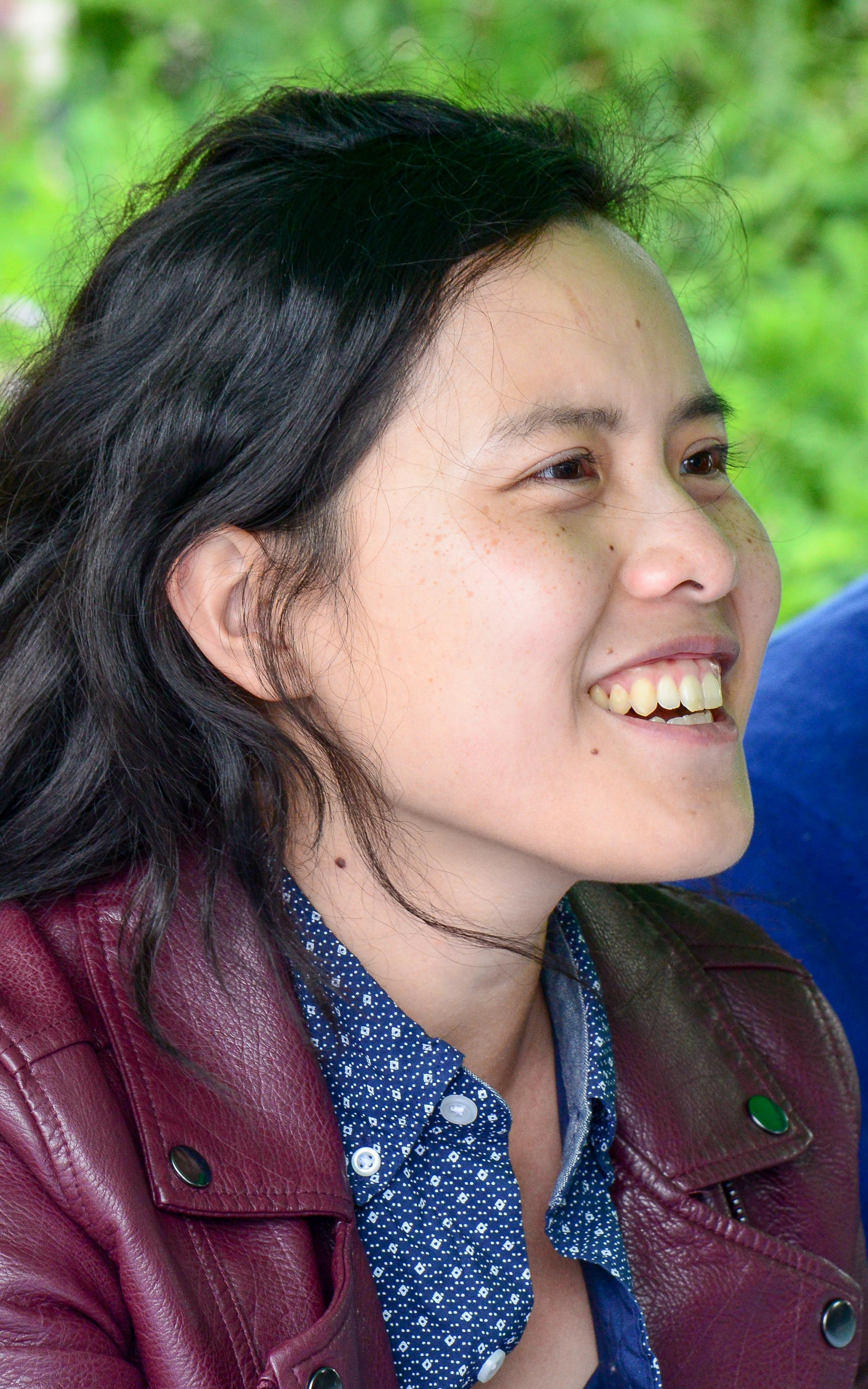
- Fu at the Eden Mills Writers' Festival in 2018
- Born: 1987 (age 38–39)
- Education: University of British Columbia
- Occupations: Novelist, short story writer, poet
- Writing career
- Period: 2010s–present
- Notable works: For Today I Am a Boy (2014); Lesser Known Monsters of the 21st Century (2022)
- Notable awards: Edmund White Award for Debut Fiction (2015); Danuta Gleed Literary Award (2023)
- Website: kim-fu.com

Kim Fu (born 1987) is a Canadian-born writer, living in Seattle, Washington. Born in Vancouver, British Columbia to immigrant parents from Hong Kong, Fu studied creative writing at the University of British Columbia.

== Writing ==
=== Novels ===
Her first novel For Today I Am a Boy was released in 2014. The book follows a Chinese Canadian transgender girl's realization of her identity through her adolescence adulthood. Writing for the Harvard Review, A. Naomi Jackson said that it was "refreshing to read a novel that illustrates the harrowing choices transgender people face alongside hope." It went on to win the Edmund White Award for Debut Fiction and was a finalist for the PEN/Hemingway Award. It was also a New York Times Book Review Editors' Choice and long-listed for CBC's Canada Reads.

Her second novel, The Lost Girls of Camp Forevermore, which follows the lives of young girls on a camping trip, was published in 2018. In Shondaland, Nicole Chung interviewed Fu regarding her second novel, in which she said, of the novel's linked-story structure: "I think a lot of it was that I knew these characters were not easy-to-like people. They're not the kind of characters you immediately understand and root for. So for each one, we needed to sit with them for a long time in order to know who they were." Reviewing it for The New York Times, Lisa Ko said the book was "multilayered exploration of how class and culture inform the girls' actions and alliances during the trip, and how the trip then affects their relationships and choices in adulthood."

=== Short fiction ===
Her short story collection Lesser Known Monsters of the 21st Century was published in 2022. Gabino Iglesias, writing for NPR, stated that it was "a wildly imaginative collection in which elements of science fiction, fantasy, and even crime fiction blend together." Melissa Darcey Hall, writing for The Adroit Journal, compared Fu's take on horror to that of Carmen Maria Machado and Mariana Enríquez, stating that "one of Fu's greatest strengths is her ability to turn horror on its head, focusing less on the terror the modern-day monsters incite, but what they reveal about ourselves."

=== Poetry ===
Fu's debut poetry collection How Festive the Ambulance received a starred review from Publishers Weekly, which called it a "playful, lyrical, and cutting, debut poetry collection" with a "dizzying display of styles and scope." Spenser Smith, for Prairie Fire, wrote that it was a "sombre, engrossing read" and, regarding Fu's writing: "her bluntness holds a level of complexity and metaphor that makes each reread of a poem very rewarding." It was also a 2017 National Magazine Awards Silver Medal winner and a Best Canadian Poetry 2016 selection.

=== Periodicals and residencies ===
Fu's writing has appeared in Granta, The Atlantic, The New York Times, Hazlitt, and The Times Literary Supplement. She has received residency fellowships from the Ucross Foundation, Berton House, Wildacres, and the Wallace Stegner Grant for the Arts.

== Awards and honours ==
=== Awards ===
- 2015 – Edmund White Award for Debut Fiction for For Today I Am a Boy.
- 2017 – Silver medal in poetry at the National Magazine Awards for a poem collected in How Festive the Ambulance.
- 2023 – Danuta Gleed Literary Award for Lesser Known Monsters of the 21st Century.

=== Finalist and longlist placements ===
- 2015 – Finalist for the PEN/Hemingway Award and the Lambda Literary Award for Transgender Fiction for For Today I Am a Boy.
- 2015 – Longlisted for Canada Reads for For Today I Am a Boy.
- 2022 – Shortlisted for the Giller Prize for Lesser Known Monsters of the 21st Century.

=== Other recognition ===
- The New York Times Book Review Editors' Choice for For Today I Am a Boy.
- A poem collected in How Festive the Ambulance was selected for Best Canadian Poetry 2016.

=== Writing residencies ===
- Residency fellowships from the Ucross Foundation, Berton House, Wildacres, and Wallace Stegner House.

== Works ==
=== Novels ===
- For Today I Am a Boy. Houghton Mifflin Harcourt, 2014. ISBN 9780544032408.
- The Lost Girls of Camp Forevermore. Houghton Mifflin Harcourt, 2018. ISBN 9780544098268.
- The Valley of Vengeful Ghosts. Tin House, 2026. ISBN 9781963108699.

=== Short story collections ===
- Lesser Known Monsters of the 21st Century. Tin House, 2022. ISBN 9781953534064.

=== Poetry collections ===
- How Festive the Ambulance: Poems. Nightwood Editions, 2016. ISBN 9780889710641.
