= Shelly Oria =

Israeli-American author (born 1978)

- Born: 1978 (age 47–48); Los Angeles, California, U.S.
- Education: Sarah Lawrence College (MFA)
- Occupation: Author
- Website: www.shellyoria.com

Shelly Oria (born 1978) is an Israeli American author, notable for short stories featuring queer characters.

== Biography ==
Oria was born in Los Angeles, California, but grew up in Israel.

Oria received a Master of Fine Arts from Sarah Lawrence College in 2007. She began writing in fiction in English, her second language, at the college in 2006. She features queer characters in her stories. Oria studied how to be a life and creativity coach while in Israel between 2008 and 2009 in the Alder Institute and with Julia Cameron in 2004.

She received the Indiana Review Fiction Prize, a Sozopol Fiction Seminars Fellowship in Bulgaria and was an artist in residence with the Lower Manhattan Cultural Council between 2014 and 2015.

Her collection of short stories, New York 1, Tel Aviv 0, was published by FSG and Random House Canada in November 2014. Her work has been featured in several publications, including The Paris Review and McSweeney's. Oria received attention about the book from The New York Times, Kirkus Review, and other outlets. New York 1, Tel Aviv 0 was translated into Hebrew and published in Israel by Keter Books in August 2015.

== Personal life ==
Oria lives in Brooklyn, New York. In September 2015, she told Israeli newspaper Yediot Ahronot that she's currently at work on several projects, including a play trilogy, a feature film, and a novel. She curates the Sweet! Actors Reading Writers series. It is currently on hiatus.

She works at the Pratt Institute as a fiction teacher and a co-director for the Writer's Forum. She's had her private practice as a life and creativity coach since 2009.

== Awards ==
As of March 16, 2015, Oria was a finalist for the Lambda Literary Award for Lesbian Fiction and a nominee for the Edmund White Award. She is also a MacDowell Colony fellow.

== Works ==
=== Books ===
- New York 1, Tel Aviv 0: Stories. Farrar, Straus and Giroux. 2014. ISBN 978-0-374-71175-7
- Indelible in the Hippocampus: Writings from the Me Too Movement (editor). McSweeneys. 2019.
- I Know What’s Best for You: Stories on Reproductive Freedom (editor). McSweeneys. 2022.
