= Riall Johnson =

Canadian gridiron football player (born 1978)

No. 50
- Position: Defensive end

Personal information
- Born: April 20, 1978 (age 48); White Rock, British Columbia, Canada
- Listed height: 6 ft 3 in (1.91 m)
- Listed weight: 243 lb (110 kg)

Career information
- High school: Mariner (Everett, Washington, U.S.)
- College: Stanford
- NFL draft: 2001: 6th round, 168th overall pick

Career history
- Cincinnati Bengals (2001–2003); Arizona Cardinals (2004)*; Denver Broncos (2004)*; Toronto Argonauts (2005–2008); Winnipeg Blue Bombers (2009); Montreal Alouettes (2009)
- * Offseason or practice squad member only

Awards and highlights
- First-team All-Pac-10 (2000); Second-team All-Pac-10 (1999)

Career NFL statistics
- Tackles: 30
- Stats at Pro Football Reference

Riall Salud Johnson (born April 20, 1978) is a Canadian former professional football player.

== Early life ==
Riall grew up in Lynnwood, Washington, where he attended Mariner High School. At Mariner he was considered one of the top football prospects in the USA.

== College career ==
He attended Stanford University. In his junior year at Stanford he tied for the Pac-10 lead in sacks with 13. In his senior year he not only led the Pac-10, but he also tied for the most sacks in the nation with future Carolina Panthers star Julius Peppers. And he became the first player ever to lead the Pac-10 in sacks in back to back years.

== Professional career ==
Despite all his success in college, he was selected in the sixth round of the 2001 NFL draft by the Cincinnati Bengals. He played 3 years for the Bengals. He appeared in 32 games and made a total of 30 tackles most of which were on special teams.

After spending the 2008 CFL season with the Toronto Argonauts, Johnson was traded to the Winnipeg Blue Bombers for linebacker Zeke Moreno on February 19, 2009. He was traded to the Montreal Alouettes in September 2009.

== NFL career statistics ==
Legend
**Bold**	Career high

Year	Team	Games		Tackles					Interceptions					Fumbles			
Year	Team	GP	GS	Cmb	Solo	Ast	Sck	TFL	Int	Yds	TD	Lng	PD	FF	FR	Yds	TD
2001	CIN	7	0	3	1	2	0.0	0	0	0	0	0	0	0	0	0	0
2002	CIN	12	0	6	4	2	0.0	0	0	0	0	0	0	0	0	0	0
2003	CIN	13	1	**21**	**13**	**8**	0.0	0	0	0	0	0	0	0	0	0	0
		32	1	30	18	12	0.0	0	0	0	0	0	0	0	0	0	0

== Personal life ==
He is the brother of Teyo Johnson, a former wide receiver of the CFL's Calgary Stampeders.
