= Eddy Boudel Tan =

Canadian writer

- Occupation: Novelist
- Writing career
- Period: 2020s – present
- Notable work: After Elias

Eddy Boudel Tan is a Canadian writer from Vancouver, British Columbia, whose 2020 debut novel After Elias was a finalist for the 2021 ReLit Award for Fiction.

== Career ==
Inspired by the Germanwings Flight 9525, After Elias centres on a gay man coping with the death of his husband-to-be in a plane crash just days before their wedding.

Boudel Tan was one of five writers named to the Writers' Trust of Canada's annual Rising Stars mentorship program in 2021. In July, he published his second novel, The Rebellious Tide.

His novel, The Tiger and the Cosmonaut, was shortlisted for the 2025 Giller Prize.

Boudel Tan, openly gay, is the son of immigrants from Brunei.

== Awards ==
Year	Work	Award	Category	Result	Ref.
2021	After Elias	Edmund White Award	—	Finalist	
2021	After Elias	ReLit Awards	Fiction	Nominated	
2022	The Rebellious Tide	Ferro-Grumley Award	—	Finalist	
2025	The Tiger and the Cosmonaut	Giller Prize	—	Finalist	

== Works ==
- After Elias (2020)
- The Rebellious Tide (2021)
- The Tiger and the Cosmonaut (2025)
