= Joseph Cassara =

American writer

- Born: 1989 (age 36–37)
- Education: Columbia University; Iowa Writers' Workshop
- Occupation: Writer
- Writing career
- Notable awards: Edmund White Award (2019)
- Website: www.josephcassara.com

Joseph Cassara (born 1989) is an American writer, whose debut novel The House of Impossible Beauties was published in 2018. The novel, an exploration of drag culture in New York City in the 1980s during the HIV/AIDS crisis, was inspired in part by Angie Xtravaganza and the film Paris Is Burning.

Originally from New Jersey, he was educated at Columbia University and the Iowa Writers' Workshop.

The novel won Publishing Triangle's Edmund White Award for LGBT debut fiction in 2019, and was shortlisted for the Lambda Literary Award for Gay Fiction at the 31st Lambda Literary Awards.

== Awards ==
Year	Work	Award	Category	Result	Ref
2019	The House of Impossible Beauties	Edmund White Award	—	Won	
2019	The House of Impossible Beauties	Lambda Literary Award	Gay Fiction	Shortlisted	

== Biblio ==
- —— (2018). The House of Impossible Beauties.
