= Sara Farizan =

Iranian-American writer

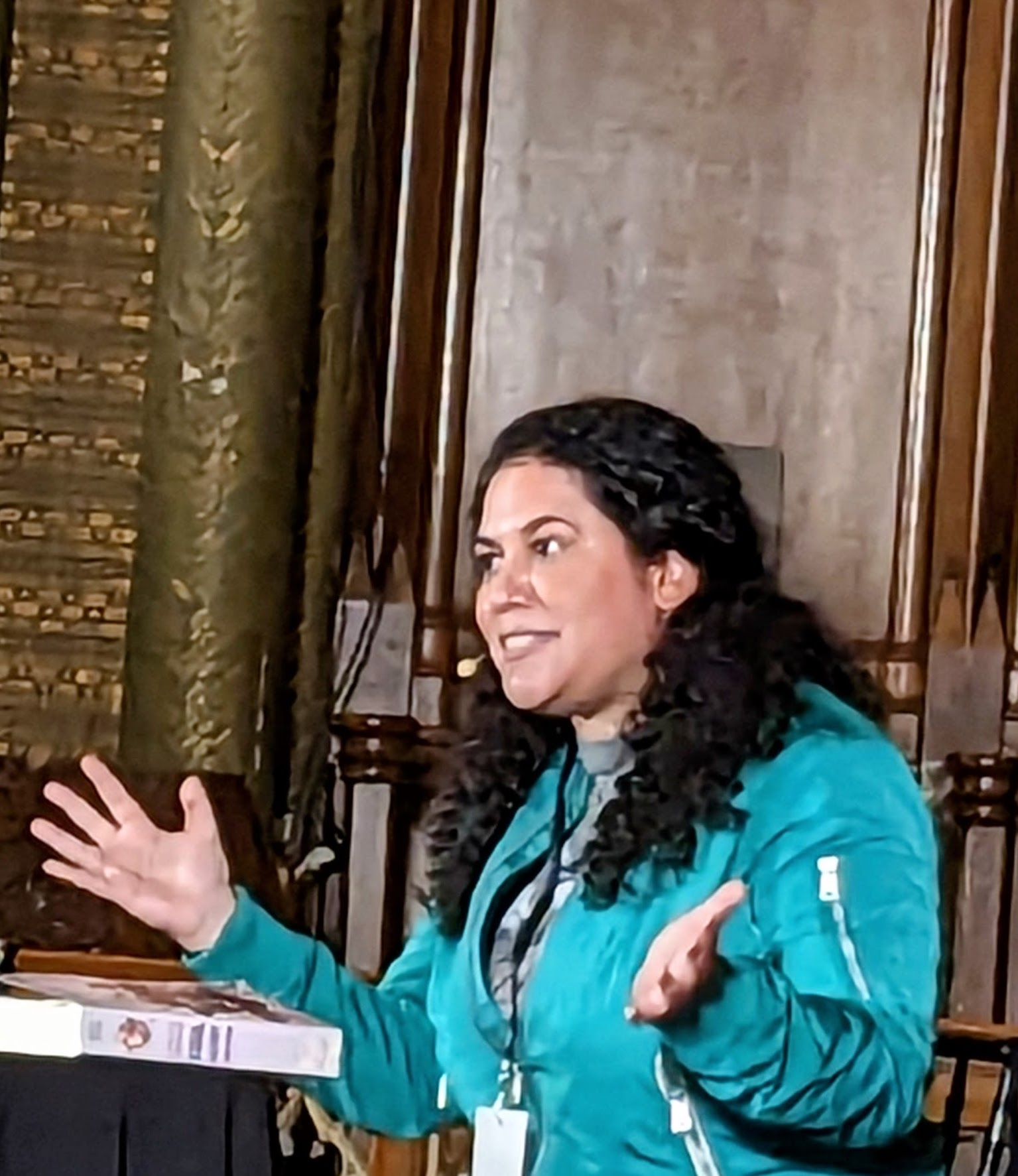
- Sara Farizan speaking at the Boston Book Festival in 2023
- Born: Newton, Massachusetts, U.S
- Occupation: Author
- Writing career
- Genre: young adult
- Notable work: If You Could Be Mine
- Notable awards: Ferro-Grumley Award; Lambda Literary Award for Children's and Young Adult Literature; Edmund White Award

Sara Farizan is an American writer of young adult literature.

Her debut novel, If You Could Be Mine, won the Ferro-Grumley Award, the Edmund White Award and the Lambda Literary Award for Children's and Young Adult Literature in 2014, and was named to the American Library Association Rainbow List as one of the year's best LGBT-themed books. Her other novels are Tell Me Again How a Crush Should Feel, which was again named to the Rainbow List for 2015, and Here to Stay.

== Bibliography ==
=== Novels ===
- If You Could Be Mine (2013)
- Tell Me Again How a Crush Should Feel (2014)
- Here to Stay (2018)
- Dead Flip (2022)

=== Short stories ===
- "Why I Learned to Cook" in Fresh Ink, edited by Lamar Giles (2018)
- "Take Me with U" in The Radical Element: 12 Stories of Daredevils, Debutantes, & Other Dauntless Girls, edited by Jessica Spotswood (2018)
- "The End of the World as We Know It" in All Out: The No-Longer-Secret Stories of Queer Teens throughout the Ages, edited by Saundra Mitchell (2018)
- "Side Work" in Hungry Hearts: 13 Tales of Food and Love, edited by Caroline Tung Richmond and Elsie Chapman (2019)
