= And Then He Sang a Lullaby =

2023 novel by Ani Kayode Somtochukwu

- Author: Ani Kayode Somtochukwu
- Language: English
- Publisher: Grove Press (Roxane Gay Books)
- Publication date: 6 June 2023
- Publication place: Nigeria
- Pages: 400
- ISBN: 9781804710180

And Then He Sang a Lullaby is a 2023 debut novel by Nigerian writer and activist Ani Kayode Somtochukwu. Published as the inaugural title of Roxane Gay Books, an imprint of Grove Press. The novel tells the story of two Nigerian men, August and Segun, as they face challenges, especially sexual identity crisis and homophobia in Nigeria. It received the 2023 Foreword INDIES Gold Award for literary fiction.

== Background ==
Ani Kayode Somtochukwu is a Nigerian poet, essayist, and queer rights activist. And Then He Sang a Lullaby is his debut novel, written as a response to the social and legal challenges faced by LGBTQ people in Nigeria. The story is set during the period surrounding the enactment of the Same Sex Marriage (Prohibition) Act 2013, which intensified restrictions on same-sex relationships and LGBTQ activism.

The novel is the debut publication from Roxane Gay Books, an imprint of Grove Press. Nigerian editions of the novel were published by Cassava Republic Press and Narrative Landscape Press.

== Plot ==
August, a university student from Enugu, struggles with guilt over the death of his mother during childbirth and the expectations placed upon him by his family. Though attracted to men, he represses his sexuality due to religious beliefs, family pressure, and fear of social rejection. In contrast, Segun is more open about his sexuality despite experiencing bullying, violence, and discrimination. He is influenced by his activist mother and becomes outspoken about injustice. When August and Segun meet at university, they begin a romantic relationship strained by trying to survive newly enacted anti-gay legislation.

== Reception ==
Publishers Weekly called the novel "a timely and striking love story", highlighting its emotional depth and authenticity. Ali Ortiz of Foreword Reviews wrote that it "interrogates love, secrecy, and a revolution in Nigeria" and praised its portrayal of the effects of religion, tradition, and politics on queer lives. In a mixed review, Kirkus Reviews felt that "the author shows promise, but the novel feels like a first draft, though certainly a well-intentioned one. Earnest but underdeveloped."

== Awards ==
- 2023 Foreword INDIES Award for literary fiction
- Edmund White Award (2024)
