= KeiVarae Russell =

American football player (born 1993)

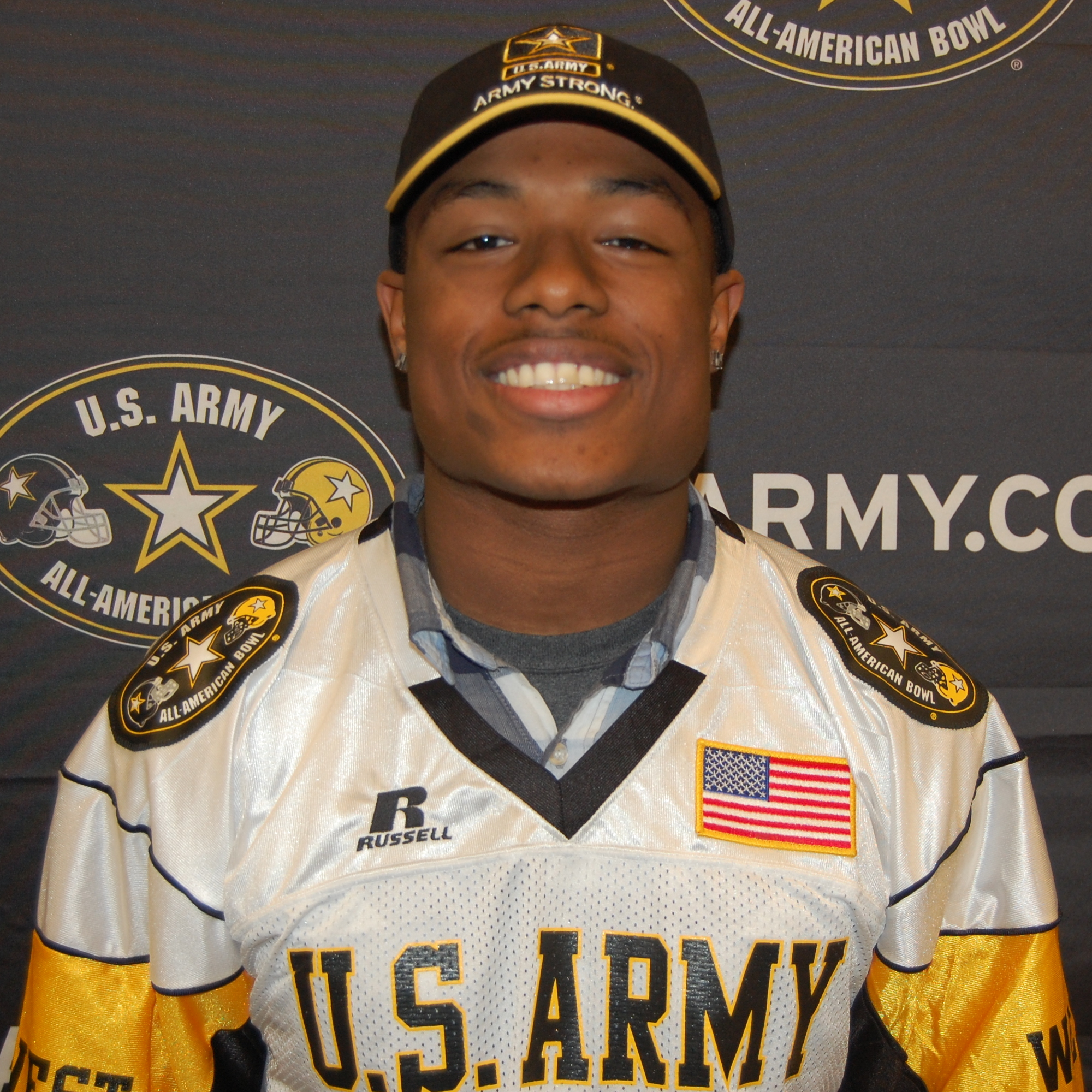
- Russell in 2011

No. 20, 34, 35
- Position: Cornerback

Personal information
- Born: October 19, 1993 (age 33); Everett, Washington, U.S.
- Listed height: 5 ft 11 in (1.80 m)
- Listed weight: 196 lb (89 kg)

Career information
- High school: Mariner (Everett)
- College: Notre Dame
- NFL draft: 2016: 3rd round, 74th overall pick

Career history
- Kansas City Chiefs (2016); Cincinnati Bengals (2016–2018); Los Angeles Chargers (2019)*; New York Giants (2020)*; Green Bay Packers (2020); New Orleans Saints (2021)
- * Offseason or practice squad member only

Awards and highlights
- Freshman All-American (2012)

Career NFL statistics
- Total tackles: 23
- Pass deflections: 2
- Interceptions: 1
- Stats at Pro Football Reference

KeiVarae Russell (born October 19, 1993) is an American former professional football player who was a cornerback in the National Football League (NFL). He was selected by the Kansas City Chiefs in the third round of the 2016 NFL draft. He played college football for the Notre Dame Fighting Irish.

== Early life ==
Russell attended Mariner High School in Everett, Washington, where he was named to the first-team Washington class 4A by the Associated Press as a senior, after gaining 1,293 rushing yards on 177 attempts with 14 touchdowns. He was selected to play in the U.S. Army All-American Bowl in San Antonio, Texas.

Considered a four-star recruit by Rivals.com, he was rated as the 9th-best athlete prospect of his class. He committed to play college football for Notre Dame on December 29, 2011, over offers from California, USC and hometown Washington.

College recruiting
| Name | Hometown | School | Height | Weight | 40^{‡} | Commit date |
|---|---|---|---|---|---|---|
| KeiVarae Russell; RB | Everett, Washington | Everett (WA) Mariner | 6 ft 0 in (1.83 m) | 175 lb (79 kg) | 4.55 | Dec 29, 2011 |
| KeiVarae Russell; RB | Recruit ratings: Scout: Rivals: (79) | | | | | |
Overall recruit ranking: Scout: 207 (national) Rivals: 9 (RB), 3 (WA), 124 (national)
Note: In many cases, Scout, Rivals, 247Sports, On3, and ESPN may conflict in their listings of height and weight.; In these cases, the average was taken. ESPN grades are on a 100-point scale.; Sources: "Notre Dame Football Commitment List". Rivals.; "Notre Dame College Football Recruiting Commits". Scout.; "ESPN". ESPN.; "Scout.com Team Recruiting Rankings". Scout.; "2012 Team Ranking". Rivals.com.

== College career ==
In his first year, Russell was moved from running back to cornerback following a season-ending injury to incumbent starter Lo Wood. He worked himself into a starting role for week 1 of the season vs. Navy, in Dublin, Ireland. Russell started all 13 games as a true freshman, including the 2013 BCS National Championship Game vs. Alabama. He recorded 58 tackles, including two for loss, and two interceptions, and was named a Freshman All-American by the Football Writers Association of America. As a sophomore, Russell started all 13 games in 2013, registering 51 tackles, one interception and eight pass break-ups.

On August 14, 2014, the University of Notre Dame announced that they were investigating suspected academic dishonesty on the part of several students, including members of the football team; Russell along with DaVaris Daniels, Kendall Moore, and Ishaq Williams were those named in the investigation, with another player, Eilar Hardy, named a few weeks later. On October 10, 2014, following the conclusion of the school's investigation, Russell was suspended for the fall and spring semesters from the school, and did not play for the Irish in the 2014–15 season.

After being suspended for seven months by the university, Russell announced on May 29, 2015 that he had been re-admitted to the university for the upcoming semester. He returned to the field and started 11 games, before missing the remaining two games with a fractured tibia. He finished his season with 60 tackles, 3.5 for loss, two interceptions, two forced fumbles, and six pass deflections. On January 4, 2016, Russell announced he would forgo his remaining eligibility at Notre Dame and enter the 2016 NFL draft.

== Professional career ==
=== Pre-draft ===
Russell was projected by analysts to be a second to fourth round draft selection. Although he was invited to the NFL Combine, he was unable to perform any workouts or drills, besides the bench press, due to a leg injury. He was later able to participate at Notre Dame's Pro Day.

Pre-draft measurables
| Height | Weight | Arm length | Hand span | Wingspan | 40-yard dash | 10-yard split | 20-yard split | 20-yard shuttle | Three-cone drill | Vertical jump | Broad jump | Bench press |
|---|---|---|---|---|---|---|---|---|---|---|---|---|
| 5 ft 11 1/8 in (1.81 m) | 192 lb (87 kg) | 31 5/8 in (0.80 m) | 10 in (0.25 m) | 6 ft 3 7/8 in (1.93 m) | 4.44 s | 1.60 s | 2.63 s | 4.00 s | 6.84 s | 38.5 in (0.98 m) | 11 ft 2 in (3.40 m) | 17 reps |
All values from NFL Combine/Pro Day

=== Kansas City Chiefs ===
Russell was drafted by the Kansas City Chiefs in the third round (74th overall) of the 2016 NFL draft. On June 13, 2016, the Kansas City Chiefs signed Russell to a four-year, $3.15 million contract with a signing bonus of $813,128. He was the last of the Chiefs' 2016 draft class to be signed to a contract. On September 14, 2016, Russell was waived by the Chiefs. He was the earliest draft pick waived that was selected in the first four rounds of the 2016 NFL Draft. Chiefs' head coach Andy Reid explained the waiving of Russell, stating that he was unable to get comfortable with the defensive scheme, didn't stand out during training camp and preseason, and was unable to climb the Chiefs' depth chart.

=== Cincinnati Bengals ===
On September 15, 2016, Russell was claimed off waivers by the Cincinnati Bengals. In Week 17 against the Ravens, on his first career snap on defense, Russell intercepted Ryan Mallett on a deep pass intended for Breshad Perriman. On September 1, 2018, Russell was waived by the Bengals and was signed to the practice squad the next day. He was promoted to the active roster on October 18, 2018. Russell was waived during final roster cuts on August 31, 2019.

=== Los Angeles Chargers ===
On November 26, 2019, Russell signed with the Los Angeles Chargers' practice squad. He was released on December 10, 2019.

=== New York Giants ===
Russell signed with the New York Giants on August 29, 2020. He was waived on September 5, 2020.

=== Green Bay Packers ===
On October 28, 2020, Russell was signed to the Green Bay Packers' practice squad. He was elevated to the active roster on November 14 for the team's week 10 game against the Jacksonville Jaguars, and reverted to the practice squad after the game. He was again elevated on January 15 and 23 for the team's divisional playoff game against the Los Angeles Rams and National Football Conference Championship Game against the Tampa Bay Buccaneers, and reverted to the practice squad again following each game. On January 26, 2021, Russell signed a reserves/futures contract with the Packers. He was released on May 24, 2021.

=== New Orleans Saints ===
On August 2, 2021, Russell signed with the New Orleans Saints. He was released on August 31, 2021 and re-signed to the practice squad. He was promoted to the active roster on November 20. He was waived on November 23, 2021 and re-signed to the practice squad. He signed a reserve/future contract with the Saints on January 11, 2022. He was waived on May 3, 2022.

== NFL career statistics ==
=== Regular season ===
| Year | Team | Games | | Tackles | | | | | Interceptions | | | | | | Fumbles | |
| Year | Team | GP | GS | Comb | Total | Ast | Sck | Sfty | PD | Int | Yds | Avg | Lng | TDs | FF | FR |
|---|---|---|---|---|---|---|---|---|---|---|---|---|---|---|---|---|
| 2016 | CIN | 5 | 0 | 1 | 1 | 0 | 0.0 | 0 | 1 | 1 | 0 | 0.0 | 0 | 0 | 0 | 0 |
| 2017 | CIN | 8 | 0 | 9 | 9 | 0 | 0.0 | 0 | 0 | 0 | 0 | 0.0 | 0 | 0 | 0 | 0 |
| 2018 | CIN | 7 | 1 | 11 | 8 | 3 | 0.0 | 0 | 1 | 0 | 0 | 0.0 | 0 | 0 | 0 | 0 |
| 2020 | GB | 1 | 0 | 9 | 9 | 0 | 0.0 | 0 | 0 | 0 | 0 | 0.0 | 0 | 0 | 0 | 0 |
| Career | | 21 | 1 | 21 | 18 | 3 | 0.0 | 0 | 2 | 1 | 0 | 0.0 | 0 | 0 | 0 | 0 |
Source: NFL.com

=== Postseason ===
| Year | Team | Games | | Tackles | | | | Interceptions | | | | | | Fumbles | |
| Year | Team | GP | GS | Comb | Total | Ast | Sck | PD | Int | Yds | Avg | Lng | TDs | FF | FR |
|---|---|---|---|---|---|---|---|---|---|---|---|---|---|---|---|
| 2020 | GB | 2 | 0 | 1 | 1 | 0 | 0 | 0 | 0 | 0 | 0.0 | 0 | 0 | 0 | 0 |
| Career | | 2 | 0 | 1 | 1 | 0 | 0 | 0 | 0 | 0 | 0.0 | 0 | 0 | 0 | 0 |
Source: pro-football-reference.com
