= Tanwi Nandini Islam =

American novelist (born 1982)

Tanaïs
- Born: Tanwi Nandini Islam; October 5, 1982 (age 43); Carbondale, Illinois, U.S.
- Education: Vassar College (AB); Brooklyn College (MFA)
- Occupations: Writer, perfumer
- Website: tanwinandini.com

Tanaïs (née Tanwi Nandini Islam) is an American writer and perfumer. They are the founder of the Brooklyn-based beauty and fragrance company TANAÏS. They are of Bangladeshi descent.

Born in Illinois, they spent their childhood in various cities such as Houston, Columbia, and St. Louis, before settling in Brooklyn. They received an AB in women's studies with a focus on performance art and Asian American studies at Vassar College and a MFA in creative writing at Brooklyn College.

== Career ==
Tanaïs first worked in New York City as a community organizer at Make the Road New York, a non-profit organization based in Bushwick, Brooklyn to empower working class communities. Later in 2006 in New Delhi, India through the William J. Clinton Fellowship for Service, they started writing their first draft of their debut novel Bright Lines. The novel was named finalist for the Center for Fiction First Novel Prize, the Brooklyn Eagles Literary Prize, and the Edmund White Award for debut fiction.

While writing Bright Lines, Tanaïs grew interested in olfaction and started their own botanically based perfume and candle line Hi Wildflower Botanica, now renamed Studio Tanaïs.

Tanaïs's 2022 memoir, In Sensorium, won the Kirkus Prize for nonfiction.

== Publications ==
- 2015: Bright Lines, Penguin Books, ISBN 978-0143123132
- 2022: In Sensorium: Notes For My People, Harper Books, ISBN 978-0358381709
