= Marriage of a Thousand Lies =

2017 novel by SJ Sindu

- Author: SJ Sindu
- Language: English
- Genre: Novel
- Publisher: Soho Press
- Publication date: 13 June 2017
- Publication place: United States
- Pages: 288
- ISBN: 9781616957902

Marriage of a Thousand Lies is a novel by Sri Lankan-American author SJ Sindu, published by Soho Press in 2017. It tells the story of Lucky and Kris, two gay South Asian-Americans whose parents immigrated from Sri Lanka, who marry to stay in the closet.

The novel won the 2018 Publishing Triangle Edmund White Award for Debut Fiction and was a Lambda Literary Award for Lesbian Fiction finalist and Stonewall Honor Book.

== Reception ==
Marriage of a Thousand Lies received positive reviews from Booklist, Lambda Literary Foundation, Publishers Weekly, Toronto Star, Ms., Paste, Los Angeles Review of Books, International Examiner, and Autostraddle.

Awards for Marriage of a Thousand Lies
Year	Award	Result	Ref.
2017	Edmund White Award for Debut Fiction	Winner	
2018	Barbara Gittings Literature Award	Honor	
2018	DSC Prize for South Asian Literature	Longlist	
2018	Goldie Award for Debut Novel	Winner	
2018	Independent Publisher Book Award for LGBT+ Fiction	Silver	
2018	Lambda Literary Award for Lesbian Fiction	Finalist	
2018	Over the Rainbow Book List	Top 10	
2018	VCU First Novel Award	Finalist	
