= Lysley Tenorio =

Filipino-American short story writer

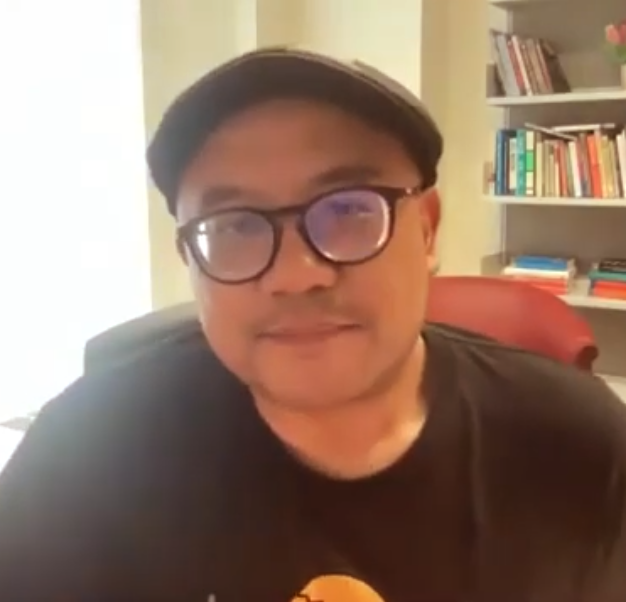
- In a San Francisco Public Library video in 2022
- Born: Olongapo, Philippines
- Occupation: Writer

Lysley A. Tenorio is a Filipino-American short story writer.

Lysley Tenorio's stories have appeared in The Atlantic, Zoetrope: All-Story, Ploughshares, Manoa, and the Best New American Voices and Pushcart Prize anthologies. A Whiting Award winner and a former Stegner Fellow at Stanford University, he has received fellowships from the University of Wisconsin, Phillips Exeter Academy, Yaddo, MacDowell, and the National Endowment for the Arts.

Born in Olongapo, Philippines, he lives in San Francisco, and is an associate professor at Saint Mary's College of California.

He is currently working on a novel.

== Awards ==
- 2000 Wallace Stegner Fellow at Stanford University
- 2002 Nelson Algren Award for Short Fiction
- 2006 Pushcart Prize for "The Brothers"
- 2006 NEA Fellowship
- 2008 Whiting Award
- 2013 Edmund White Award
- 2014 The Paris Review Writer-In-Residence at The Standard Hotel
- 2015 Joseph Brodsky Rome Prize, awarded by the American Academy of Arts and Letters
- 2020 James Merrill House Fellowship
- 2020 New American Voices Award by the Institute for Immigration Research in the US

== Works ==
=== Novel ===
- —— (2020). The Son of Good Fortune (hardcover 1st ed.). Ecco. ISBN 9780062059574.

=== Short story collections ===
- —— (1998). The View from Culion: Stories. University of Oregon. (Thesis/Dissertation manuscript)
- —— (2012). Monstress. Ecco. ISBN 9780062059567.

=== Short stories ===
- —— (Fall 2000). "Help". Ploughshares.
- —— (June 2003). "Monstress". The Atlantic.
- —— (Summer 2009). "Felix Starro". Zoetrope: All-Story.
- —— (August 2011). "L'Amour, CA". The Atlantic.

=== Anthology appearances ===
- Charles Baxter; John Kulka; Natalie Danford, eds. (2001). Best New American Voices 2001. Harcourt. ISBN 9780156010658.
- Barbara Kingsolver; Katrina Kenison, eds. (2001). The Best American Short Stories. Houghton Mifflin. ISBN 9780395926888.
- Jessica Hagedorn, ed. (2013). Manila Noir. Akashic Books. ISBN 9781617751608.
