= Mariner High School (Everett, Washington) =

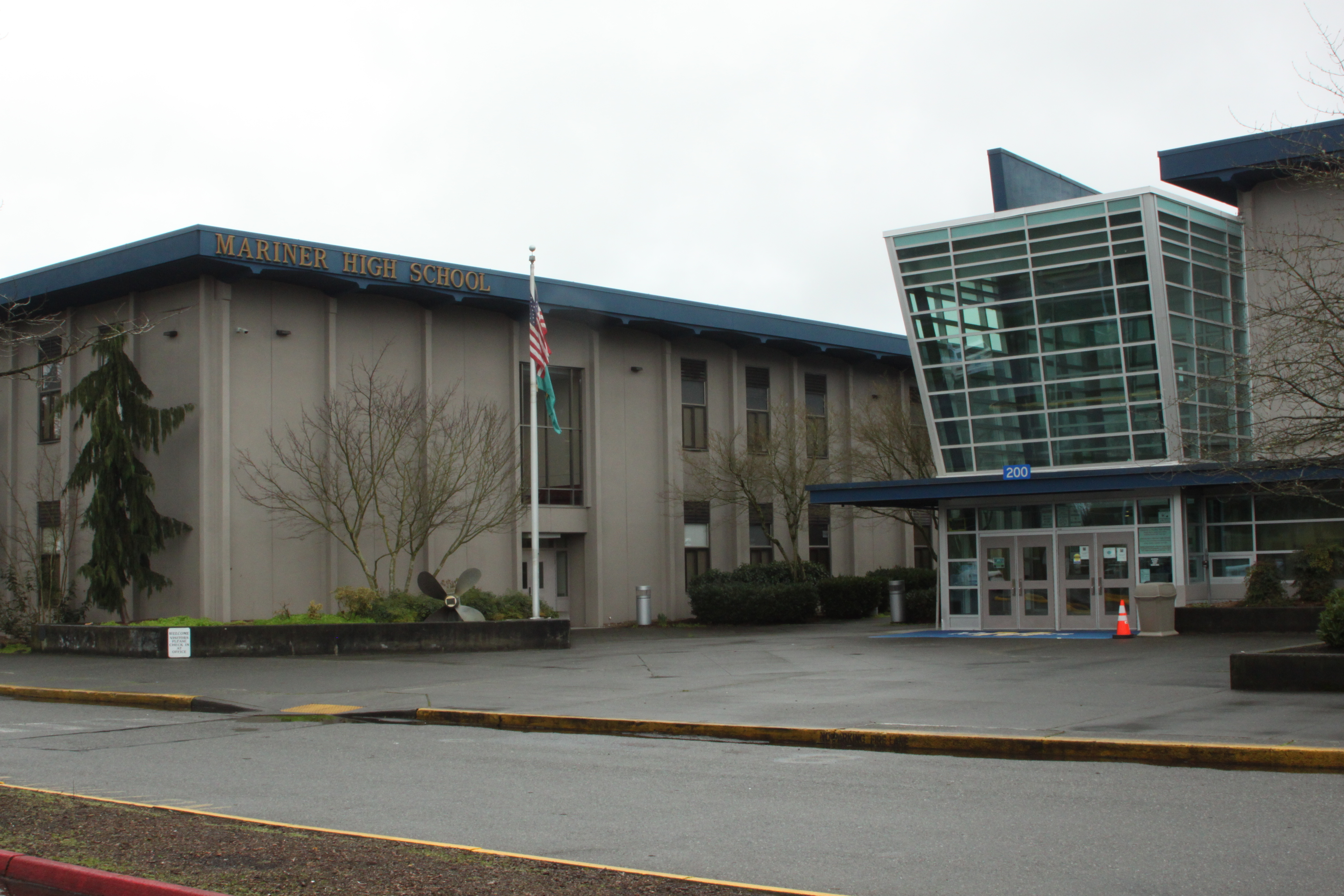

Location
- 200 120th Street Southwest; Everett, Washington 98204; United States; 47°53′18″N 122°14′10″W

Information
- Type: Public
- Established: September 8, 1970
- School district: Mukilteo School District
- NCES School ID: 530543000818
- Principal: Marcus Pimpleton
- Teaching staff: 103.70 (FTE)
- Grades: 9–12
- Enrollment: 2,100 (2023-2024)
- Student to teacher ratio: 20.25
- Colors: Navy, Gold & Silver
- Athletics conference: Wesco 4A
- Mascot: Orcas
- Team name: Marauders
- Rival: Kamiak High School
- Website: ma.mukilteoschools.org

Mariner High School is a public high school located in unincorporated Snohomish County, Washington, United States, just south of Everett. It opened on September 8, 1970, as the only high school serving the Mukilteo School District; it held this title until Kamiak High School opened in 1993. It currently serves grades 9 through 12.

== History ==
Prior to the construction of Mariner High School, the Mukilteo School District only offered education from kindergarten through ninth grade. As a result, students within the district from tenth grade onward had to attend Everett High School in the nearby Everett School District; Cascade High School provided a closer option when it opened in 1961. At the time, the school district was considered too small to operate a high school, having only operated two incarnations of Rosehill School on the Mukilteo waterfront from the first one's opening in 1893 until the opening of Olympic View Junior High School in 1956, but it was reconsidered as south Everett began to expand in the 1960s.

With the then-newly-built local Boeing plant looming, voters within the boundaries of the school district approved bonds to fund construction of Mariner High School in 1967. Having yet to receive additional revenue from the presence of the facility, the district placed three funding measures on the November 1968 ballot; the measures were intended to fund the completion of Mariner and other schools in the district. However, all three measures failed to attain 60 percent approval, and when bids opened on December 10 for construction of Mariner, it was revealed that going with the initial bid for the project meant that the district would have insufficient funds to furnish Mariner. Fearing the possibility of receiving a lower bid with a rebid if they elected to pass on the existing one 60 days after the initial opening, the district placed all three measures again on the ballot for January 21, 1969; the measures passed this time, with construction starting the same month.

The high school campus, designed by Everett-based William Arild Johnson & Associates, was constructed as a prefabricated structure consisting of prestressed and precast concrete units at a cost of $3.3 million; purchasing the land for it brought the overall cost close to $5 million. It opened on September 8, 1970, and was formally dedicated on January 10, 1971; it had no senior class in its opening year.

Mariner was one of 25 American schools selected for an exchange program with the Soviet Union in 1989 as agreed upon with the Moscow Summit the previous year. Under the program, 10 Soviet students were to visit Mariner in January of that year for a monthlong stay, and vice versa for 10 Mariner students in the springtime. In June of that year, a vote of no confidence by Mariner teachers contributed to the reassignment of then-Principal Suzanne Simonson, who had held the position since 1981, to an administrative post; an unidentified teacher stated that Simonson, who had previously went through a referendum in 1985, had only 6 percent of support compared to 72 percent against, with 22 percent abstaining. Len Link, a former assistant principal at Olympic View, was named interim principal.

When Mariner opened, Olympic View was its only feeder school; however, it was not long before Mariner started receiving students from Explorer Junior High School as well upon the latter's opening in 1973. This setup remained until the 1993 opening of Kamiak, at which point the district switched from junior high to middle schools, with the district adding two of the latter in the process. This meant the addition of ninth-graders to the student body of Mariner for the 1993–94 school year onward, with the school gaining then-new, adjacent Voyager Middle School as a feeder; Mariner retained Explorer as well in the realignment.

Just weeks after the September 11 attacks and the start of the 2001 anthrax attacks, Mariner was evacuated on October 10 when pepper spray was released into the school's ventilation system. Everyone inside was moved to on-site Goddard Stadium around 10:50 AM, just minutes after numerous health complaints from students were made; classes were eventually canceled for the rest of the day. 30 students were sent to Providence Everett Medical Center for treatment; all were released later that day without any major injuries.

A year later, a medical emergency occurred on October 3, 2002 when 16-year-old student Sarah Dotson complained of a headache, then collapsed at 8 AM during her first-period computer class. Despite the school nurse performing CPR on Dotson until paramedics arrived, she died shortly after arriving at Providence Everett Medical Center; her death was announced on the school's public address system at around 9 AM. Medical examiners discovered that Dotson had an enlarged heart and a coronary artery condition; they ruled out infection or contagious disease in her death.

Mariner was one of 16 schools in the state selected by the Bill & Melinda Gates Foundation for the Washington State Achievers Program in 2001. As part of the requirements for the more than $1 million grant, Mariner was divided into six small learning communities at the beginning of the 2003–04 school year on September 2, 2003, undergoing a renovation and expansion at the same time that added 28 classrooms to the school. Designed by the DLR Group, the new classrooms were grouped into clusters of four and five to accommodate the new program.

On September 14, 2018, a fight that broke out in a parking lot at Goddard Stadium escalated into a drive-by shooting during an evening football game between Mariner and cross-district rival Kamiak. The shooting occurred in the fourth quarter, with the stadium subsequently evacuated. Investigators later determined that the shooting was gang-related; it was the latest of 82 gang-related shootings that occurred in south Everett since January 2015.

For the 2019–20 school year, Mariner honored its 50th anniversary by holding a celebration prior to its (football) homecoming game against Mount Vernon High School on October 11. District administrators attended the event along with school alumni and former school employees. However, the school's anniversary was marred by the COVID-19 pandemic; the district temporary closed Mariner on March 2, 2020, due to a student's parent testing positive for COVID-19 before permanently closing all its schools for the rest of the school year on March 12 under the statewide mandate of Governor Jay Inslee.

== Academics ==
Mariner offers 16 Advanced Placement courses: Calculus AB, Calculus BC, Statistics, English Language and Composition, English Literature and Composition, Computer Science, Java, Biology, Chemistry, Physics 1, US Government and Politics, World History, US History, French Language and Culture, Spanish Language and Culture, Studio Art, as well as several honors courses.

Mariner additionally offers free College in the High School. CiHS is a program that provides high school students, in grades 9-12, the opportunity to earn both high school and college credit for advanced, college-level coursework offered at their high school.

== Athletics ==
Mariner competes in the WESCO 4A Conference, their rivals include Everett High School (Everett School District) as well as Henry M. Jackson High School and Cascade High School (Everett School District).

The Marauders football team led the group towards the WIAA State Tournament in 1998, however fell short of a championship title losing to Capital High School. Later, The Mariner Marauder unified soccer team won the state title after a perfect 2022-2023 season. Before that the Mariner boys basketball team showcased their talents as top contenders at the 1998-1999 Hardwood Classic finishing 3rd in state playoffs. The Marauders football team made WIAA State Tournament appearances in 2006-2007, then again by the following season 2007-2008. Meanwhile, Marauders boys basketball team made three consecutive trips to state in the 2006-2007, 2007–2008, and 2008-2009 seasons. Later, again, the Marauders boys basketball team made two consecutive trips to state in the 2021-2022 and 2022-2023 seasons. In addition, the Mariner Marauder soccer team competed in two WIAA State Tournament in 2010-2011, then again 2015-2016 which both resulted in tough losses finishing the season as quarter finalist. Nonetheless, Marauders football established their program by making three straight postseason appearances from 2014-2015, 2015-2016, then again in 2016-2017. However, Marauders of 2016-2017 were victorious on the road against highly touted Kennedy Catholic High School resulting 51-6 in the regional matchup; Making their first appearance in the 4A WIAA Gridiron Classic, since the previous decade.

- Baseball
- Basketball (Boys and Girls and Unified)
- Cross Country
- Cheerleading
- Dance
- Football
- Golf (Boys and Girls)
- Soccer (Boys and Girls and Unified)
- Fastpitch Softball
- Swimming (Boys and Girls)
- Tennis (Boys and Girls)
- Track and Field
- Volleyball
- Wrestling
- Football School Records
- Larry Stovall-Moody 60 yard field goal (1996)

=== Incidents ===
A member of the girls varsity basketball team filed a complaint with the Lakewood School District, alleging that racist remarks were made by Lakewood High School spectators during a game on May 20, 2021, between Mariner and Lakewood. Simmons Sweeney Smith, a Bellingham-based law firm hired by the Mukilteo and Lakewood districts as an independent investigator, found the complaints valid in a 25-page report submitted to the districts on June 9. The report also noted that the animosity spread to the court in the form of aggressive play due to the lack of intervening by the referees, with several Lakewood players injured during the game. With about four minutes left in the fourth quarter and his team trailing 35–38, Mariner coach Reggie Davis pulled his team from the court; their rematch, scheduled for the following week, was canceled.

== Culture ==
Mariner High School was a recipient of the Achievers Scholarship which was funded by The Bill & Melinda Gates Foundation. This scholarship was provided to Washington State's (and Washington D.C.'s) high crime, low-income areas. Most of the Achievers schools were focused in urban areas: Tacoma, Seattle and Everett. There were 16 Achievers schools, unfortunately the Achievers Scholarship program has ended, the last cohort being the Class of 2010. The scholarship program made a significant and positive difference in the lives of myriad Mariner High School graduates. This high school contains a variety of backgrounds and cultures that led to it being the most diverse high school among South Everett. Being related to that, a new after school club was created in the school year of 2017-18, which is often only seen in community colleges and universities. This after school club is named M.E.Ch.A ( (Spanish: Movimiento Estudiantil Chicanx de Aztlán) (English: "Chicanx Student Movement of Aztlán"), this after school club is organized by two students of color from the graduating class of 2019. Who offer an outreach to first generation students attending higher education. Mariner High School M.E.Ch.A contributed with Voyager Middle School and its 8th graders getting ready to transition into high school. (M.E.Ch.A JR.)

== Notable alumni ==
- Brian Sullivan (politician), former Mukilteo city council member (1986-1989), Mukilteo mayor (1990-1997), former member of the Washington House of Representatives (2002-2008), former member of Snohomish County Council (2008-2020), and the current treasurer of Snohomish County.
- Aaron Reardon (politician), former member of the Washington House of Representatives (1999-2993), former member of the Washington Senate (2003), former Snohomish County Executive (2004-2013)
- Mary Lambert (singer)
- Rick Anderson (pitcher/coach)
- Gina Segadelli, former United States women's national soccer team forward
- KeiVarae Russell, former NFL cornerback
- Lamont Brightful, former NFL defensive back player
- Riall Johnson, former NFL linebacker
- Teyo Johnson, former NFL tight end
- Ahmani Johnson, former NFL linebacker
