= Monstress (short story collection) =

2012 collection of stories by Lysley Tenorio

- First edition (publ. Ecco Books)
- Author: Lysley Tenorio
- Language: English
- Publisher: Ecco Books
- Publication date: 2012

Monstress is a 2012 collection of stories by Lysley Tenorio.

== Plot ==
In "Monstress", Filipina actress Reva Gogo and her B-Movie director boyfriend go to Los Angeles hoping that an American director can help them be successful.

In "Help", a man recruits his nephew to fight the Beatles for being rude to Imelda Marcos.

In "Superassassin", an isolated boy writes a biographical report on the Green Lantern and practices being a super-powered avenger with disastrous results.

In "Felix Starro", the grandson of a famous Filipino faith healer plans his escape from the family business.

In "The Brothers", a man buries his transgender sister with the help of her friend and remembers the brother he lost.

In "The View From Culion", a young woman raised in a leper colony strikes up a tentative friendship with a US Navy officer afflicted with the disease.

In "Save the I-Hotel", an elderly man tries to manage his homosexual desire for his oldest friend.
