= Mukilteo, Washington =

City in Washington, United States

Mukilteo bək̓ʷəɬtiwʔ
- City
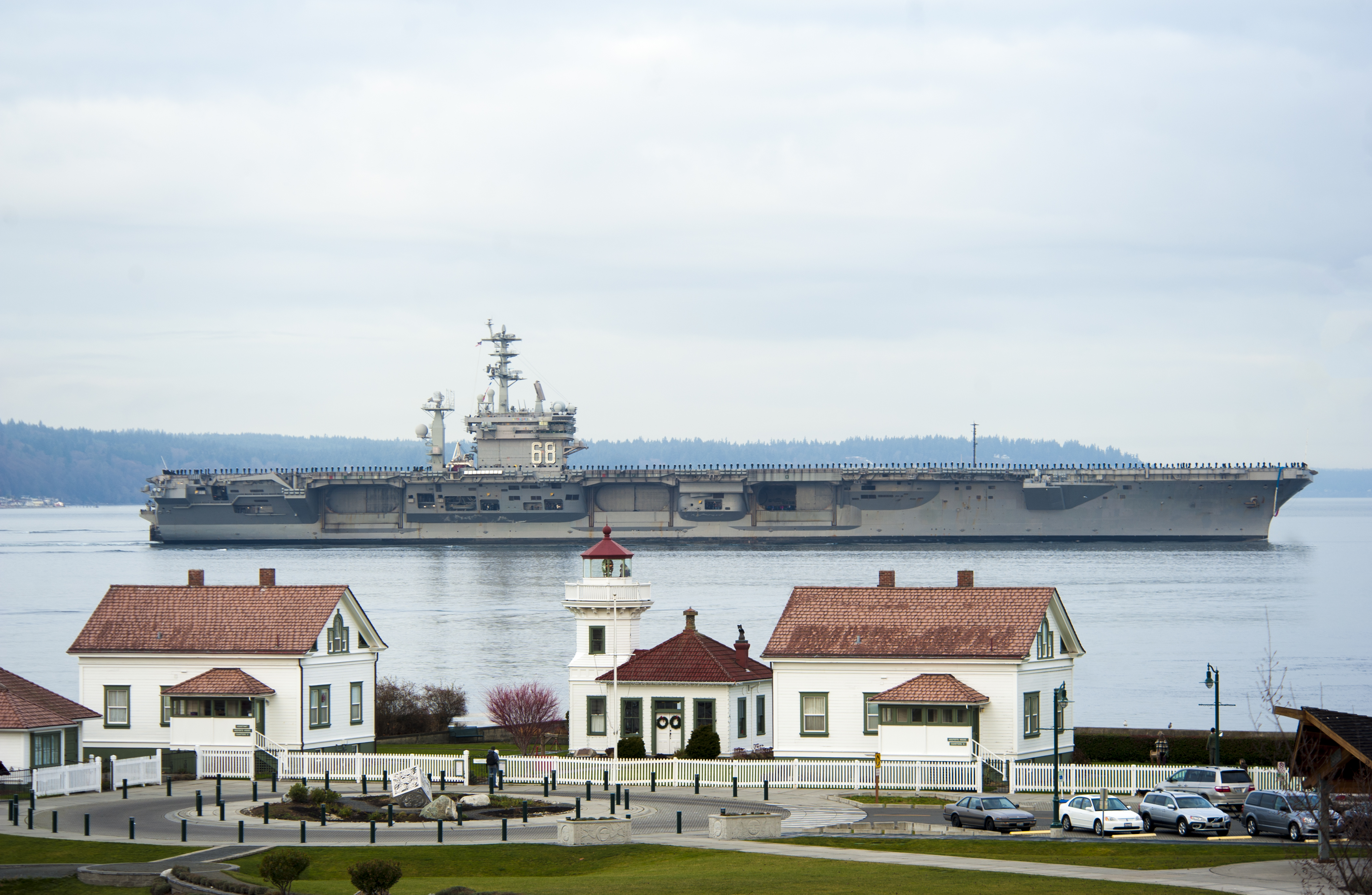
- The USS Nimitz passing the Mukilteo Lighthouse

- Logo
- Interactive map of Mukilteo
- Coordinates: 47°54′58″N 122°18′11″W
- Country: United States
- State: Washington
- County: Snohomish
- Established: c. 1857
- Incorporated: May 8, 1947

Government
  - Type: Mayor–council
  - Mayor: Joe Marine

Area
  - Total: 7.44 sq mi (19.26 km^{2})
  - Land: 6.25 sq mi (16.20 km^{2})
  - Water: 1.18 sq mi (3.06 km^{2})
- Elevation: 0–597 ft (0–182 m)

Population (2020)
  - Total: 21,538
  - Estimate (2024): 21,299
  - Density: 2,896.3/sq mi (1,118.28/km^{2})
- Time zone: UTC−8 (PST)
  - Summer (DST): UTC−7 (PDT)
- ZIP Code: 98275
- Area code: 425
- FIPS code: 53-47735
- GNIS feature ID: 1512491
- Website: mukilteowa.gov

Mukilteo (/ˌmʌkəlˈtiːoʊ/ MUK-əl-TEE-oh; Lushootseed: bək̓ʷəɬtiwʔ (Note: Lushootseed pronunciation: [/.bək̓ʷ.əɬˈti͜uʔ/] buhk-wulh-TEE-oo; variously spelled bəqɬtiuʔ, bəqɬtiyuʔ, bəkʷəɬtiu, and bək̓ʷəɬtiwʔ, and variously anglicized as Muckl-te-oh and Buk-wil-tee-whu)) is a city in Snohomish County, Washington, United States. It is located on Puget Sound between Edmonds and Everett, approximately 25 miles (40 km) north of Seattle. The city had a population of 21,538 at the 2020 census and an estimated 2024 population of 21,299.

The current site of downtown Mukilteo (also named Old Town) has been inhabited by the Snohomish people for at least 1,000 years before present. The Treaty of Point Elliott was signed in Mukilteo in 1855, opening the region to American settlement. A new town was founded at Mukilteo and served as the provisional county seat of Snohomish County in early 1861. The area remained a trading post for loggers and was home to other industries, but was overshadowed by Everett and grew slowly.

Mukilteo was used during World War II as an auxiliary fueling facility, due to its proximity to the newly built Snohomish County Airport (now Paine Field). Mukilteo was incorporated as a city in 1947 and saw new suburban development, which accelerated after the opening of the nearby Boeing Everett Factory in the late 1960s. The city annexed large suburban areas on the west side of Paine Field in the 1980s and 1990s, including Harbour Pointe and the State Route 525 corridor, while also revitalizing the Old Town area in the 2000s.

Today, Mukilteo is a bedroom community with a small job base centered around manufacturing industries. It is also a major transportation hub, with connections to Whidbey Island via the Washington State Ferries system, Sounder commuter trains to Seattle, and public transit services to nearby cities. The city is recognized for its quality of life and is one of the most affluent in Washington state, with a high median income.

== Etymology ==
The name Mukilteo is derived from Lushootseed, the language of the Snohomish people and other Coast Salish tribes. The name for the area in Lushootseed is variously spelled as bəqɬtiuʔ, bəqɬtiyuʔ, bəkʷəɬtiu, and bək̓ʷəɬtiwʔ. It has been historically anglicized as Muckl-te-oh and Buk-wil-tee-whu, before finally being named Mukilteo. The etymology of bək̓ʷəɬtiwʔ is disputed. According to anthropologist T. T. Waterman's sources from the Snohomish tribe and other written records, the name's meaning was unclear. Other sources claim that the name means "good camping ground" or "narrow passage".

== History ==
=== Establishment and early history ===
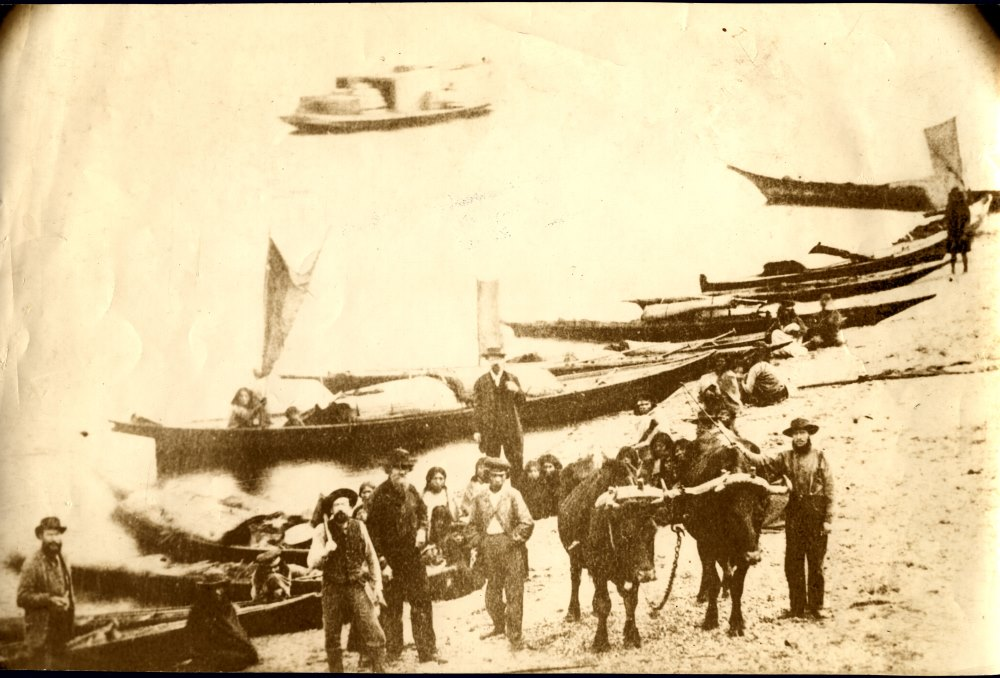
A photograph of American settlers and Native Americans on the beach in Mukilteo, c. 1861–62

The Snohomish people had a year-round village in the Mukilteo area for at least 600 years before the arrival of European and American explorers in the 19th century. Early artifacts uncovered during waterfront construction in the 2010s were carbon dated to 1,000 years before present.

The Vancouver Expedition, led by British explorer George Vancouver, visited the area on May 30, 1792, and landed at modern-day Mukilteo the following day. Lieutenant William Robert Broughton and botanist Archibald Menzies named the site "Rose Point" after the wild Nootka roses that grew along the shore. An American expedition led by Charles Wilkes in 1841 renamed the headland "Point Elliott" for Samuel Elliott, a midshipman.

After its 1853 establishment, the Washington territorial government looked to negotiate treaties with the local tribes of the Puget Sound region to secure land for settlement. On January 22, 1855, representatives from the territorial government and 82 local tribes signed the Treaty of Point Elliott, which ceded tribal territories in exchange for compensation, the establishment of Indian reservations, and access to traditional hunting and fishing areas. An American settlement at Point Elliott was established two years later by Morris H. Frost and J. D. Fowler, two merchants from New York. The two men established a store and saloon on the southwest side of Point Elliott, which was renamed to Mukilteo in 1860 by Fowler, using an anglicized name of the Lushootseed campsite.

Mukilteo was the area's first trading post and served as the interim county seat of the newly created Snohomish County beginning January 14, 1861. In the first county elections on July 8, 1861, the county seat was moved to Cadyville (now Snohomish) by a 17–10 vote. Mukilteo remained the county's only port and a major trading post for the Possession Sound region, and soon after received the county's first post office and telegraph station. The town was relocated to another, more protected side of Point Elliott and supported the regional lumber industry, including regular shipments to Whidbey Island and a sawmill of its own. By the 1880s, it had also gained a brewery, a gunpowder plant, and the Puget Sound region's first cannery. Mukilteo was planned to become the largest port on Possession Sound, with a summer resort accessible by steamship, but the efforts ceased after the establishment of nearby Everett by East Coast industrialists.

=== Early 20th century ===
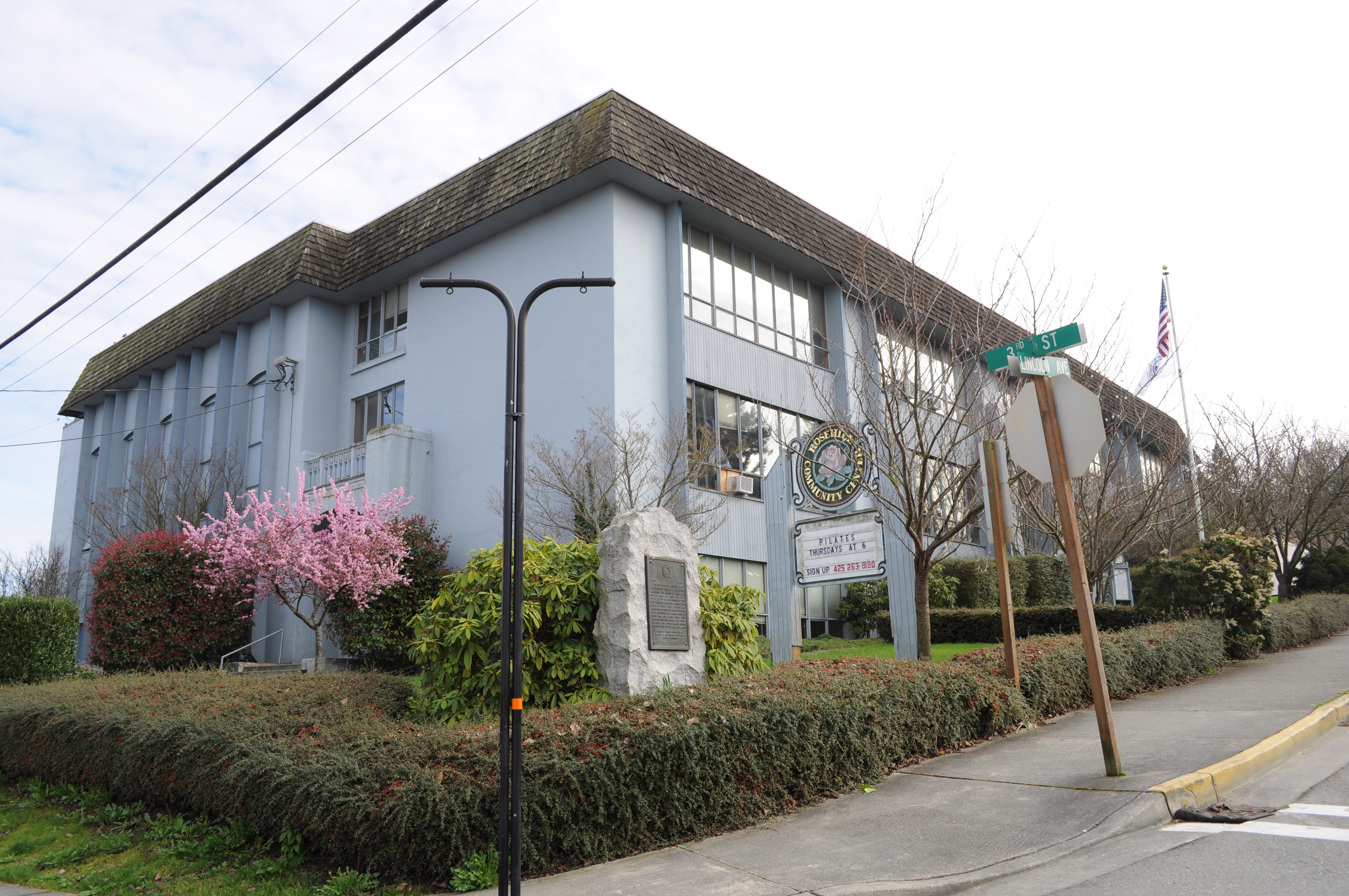
The former Rosehill School, constructed in 1928 and later converted into a community center before its demolition in 2010

The Seattle and Montana Railroad (later part of the Great Northern Railway) was completed in 1891, connecting Mukilteo with Everett, Edmonds, and Seattle. Mukilteo was platted in anticipation of the railroad and was on the shortlist of towns considered for the terminus of the Northern Pacific Railway, but lost out to Tacoma in 1873. Following the 1890s economic depression, the town experienced a major employment and population boom, with a larger lumber mill and gunpowder factory both built along the shore. The iconic Mukilteo Lighthouse was built in 1906 by the federal Lighthouse Service to serve the increased maritime traffic in the area.

Japanese immigrants arrived to work in Mukilteo's mills after the turn of the century, establishing a Japantown in modern-day Japanese Gulch. Passenger ferry service between Mukilteo and Whidbey Island began in 1911 and was followed by the introduction of automobile ferry service in 1919. The town also gained a highway connection in 1914 with the completion of a road to Everett, later named Mukilteo Boulevard by the 1920s. Until the closure of the lumber mill in 1930, Mukilteo was a company town that relied on the Crown Lumber Company to assist in civic endeavors, including its parks, fire department, and water district; at its peak, it employed 250 men.

During the Prohibition Era, Mukilteo became a major transiting point for rum-running and was a stopover for smugglers transporting alcohol from British Columbia to Seattle. The town's gunpowder plant was destroyed on September 17, 1930, in an after-hours explosion that leveled or damaged dozens of homes, causing $500,000 in damage. It was felt as far as downtown Everett and injured eight people, but none were killed. On August 30, 1938, the vacant lumber mill was destroyed in a fire during dismantling work. The fire came weeks after a mail ferry rammed into the town's wharf, which was destroyed in the collision.

After the United States entered World War II, the site of the former lumber mill was acquired by the federal government and rebuilt as a 1,500-foot-long (460 m) ammunition loading dock for warships. The recently built Snohomish County Airport (later renamed Paine Field) southeast of the city was converted into a military base while retaining some civilian uses, including passenger service provided by Alaska Airlines. During the early 1950s, the loading dock was expanded with ten large storage tanks that were used to store jet fuel for military planes until 1989.

=== Incorporation and late 20th century ===
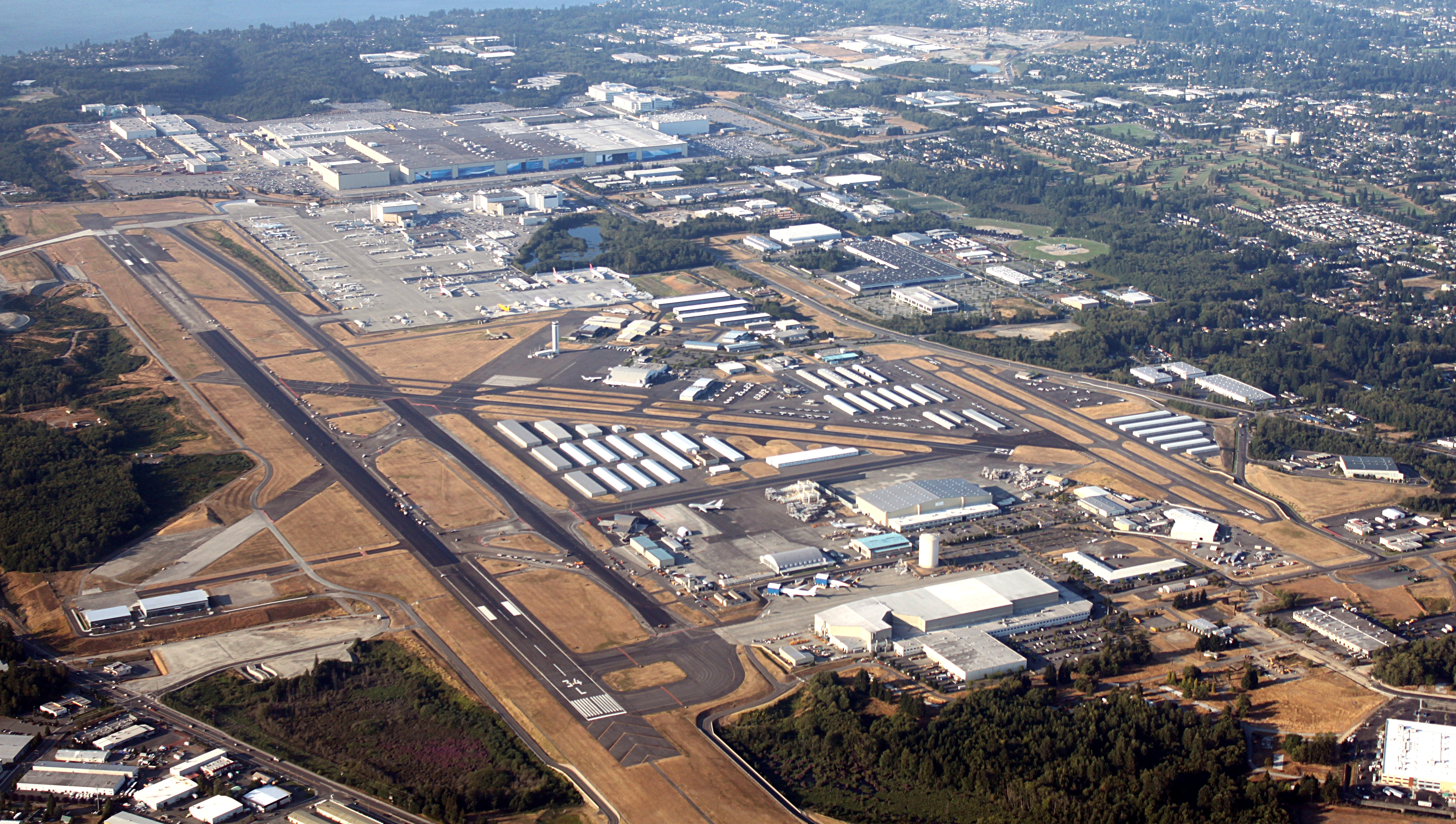
Aerial view of Paine Field, home to the Boeing Everett Factory

On April 29, 1947, Mukilteo residents voted 223 to 137 in favor of incorporating as a fourth-class city and elected school administrator Alfred Tunem as its first mayor. The incorporation was certified by the state government on May 8; at the time, Mukilteo had an estimated population of 775 people and encompassed 794 acres (321 ha). The new municipal government took over services that were previously handled by the self-organized Mukilteo Improvement Club, which was established in the 1930s. The area experienced additional population and commercial growth after the opening of Boeing's Paine Field factory for passenger jetliners in 1967, which was connected to Mukilteo by a short railroad along the floor of Japanese Gulch. The Boeing Freeway was opened in 1969, linking southern Mukilteo and the Boeing plant to a junction with Interstate 5 near the newly built Everett Mall.

Mukilteo completed its first major annexation in November 1980, adding 2,500 people living on 2 square miles (5.2 km^{2}) to the south along State Route 525. This annexation nearly tripled the city's population and doubled its land area. Additional annexations and natural growth by the end of the decade brought the city's population to 6,000. The annexation of the large Harbour Pointe community was completed in 1991 and doubled the city's size to 6.6 square miles (17.09 km^{2}). A competing proposal had sought to incorporate the planned community into a new city of 24,000 people, tentatively named Highland Bay, but residents supported annexation as a mutually agreeable option to reduce their taxes and benefit from city services. The annexation was also influenced by the county government's plans to allow passenger flights from Paine Field, which residents in Mukilteo and Harbour Pointe opposed alongside other nearby cities. The county ultimately withdrew their proposal to introduce passenger flights.

Several parties that opposed the annexation, including the county fire district, withdrew their complaints and allowed Mukilteo to annex Harbour Pointe on March 26, 1991. The annexation added 4,779 residents and 3.4 square miles (8.8 km^{2}) to Mukilteo, doubling the city's population to 6,662 and size to 6.6 square miles (17 km^{2}). It required the construction of two new fire stations, three schools, and a new city hall to house new employees. Kamiak High School was built in the Harbour Pointe area and opened in 1993 to serve Mukilteo, which had outgrown Mariner High School, and featured a technology-oriented curriculum. The full build-out of Harbour Pointe increased the city's population to over 18,000 by 2000, a 1,164 percent increase from 1980. The geographic and commercial center of Mukilteo was shifted further south towards Harbour Pointe, leading to cultural clashes with residents of older neighborhoods.

=== 21st century ===
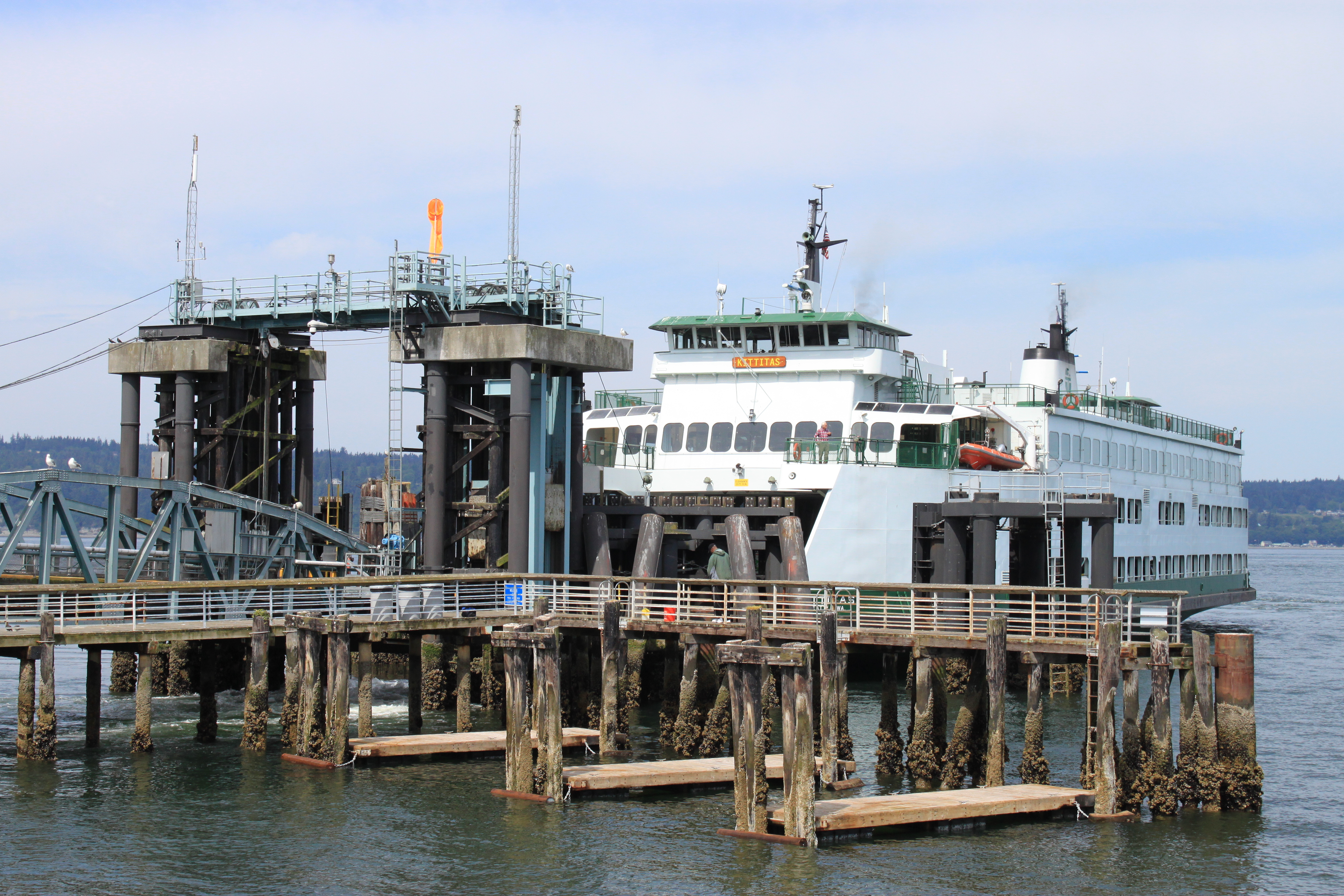
MV Kittitas at the former Mukilteo ferry terminal, which was replaced in 2020

An agreement to transfer ownership of the Mukilteo Lighthouse from the U.S. Coast Guard to the city government was signed in 1999 after a decade of partial use as a museum by the local historical society. The changeover was made on August 19, 2001, with the Coast Guard retaining use of the working lights and the city government planning rehabilitation work to support the building's use as a tourist landmark. The adjacent Mukilteo State Park was transferred to the city government in February 2003, following an offer from the Washington State Parks and Recreation Commission to donate the park in order to stave off a budget shortfall. The new city park, named Mukilteo Lighthouse Park, underwent $6.6 million in renovations that were completed in 2008 to add a playground and other park amenities.

The 22-acre (8.9 ha) decommissioned fuel storage tank complex on the city's waterfront was identified for potential redevelopment in the 1990s, including use for a new ferry terminal. The Port of Everett led environmental cleanup of the site and constructed a new pier to transport large airplane sections for the Boeing 787 project, replacing the existing pier. The cleanup was completed in late 2006 after several delays due to the discovery of Indian artifacts that triggered an archaeological investigation. The existing pier was demolished in 2015 to make way for the new ferry terminal, which opened on December 29, 2020. The new terminal includes connections to an adjacent commuter rail station, which opened in 2008 and was expanded in 2016 by Sound Transit.

A research station for the Northwest Fisheries Science Center (part of NOAA) on the tank farm site was closed in 2020 and planned to be demolished in 2020 until the onset of the COVID-19 pandemic halted work. A project to build a new facility by 2022 was cancelled in March 2021 after NOAA received no bids below $40 million, which had been appropriated by the U.S. Congress; ownership of the property is expected to revert to the Port of Everett, which NOAA took over ownership from in 2001. The city government and Port of Everett has long-term plans to redevelop 26 acres (11 ha) of space around the old ferry terminal and NOAA facility into a walkable neighborhood with a waterfront promenade and trails.

On July 30, 2016, a mass shooting occurred at a house party in the Chennault Beach neighborhood of Mukilteo, around midnight. Three people were killed using an AR-15 style rifle and another was left with serious injuries. The perpetrator, a graduate of Kamiak High School, was sentenced to life imprisonment without the possibility of parole. The Mukilteo shooting—along with other high-profile mass shootings during the 2010s—was cited as the inspiration for an assault weapons restriction that was rejected by the state legislature and passed by voters in 2018 as Initiative 1639. In February 2018, an Everett resident was arrested prior to a planned school shooting that would have targeted ACES Alternative High or Kamiak High School.

The city annexed an 84-acre (34 ha) section of land south of Paine Field between Mukilteo Speedway and Beverly Park Road on July 16, 2025, citing its close proximity to city services.

== Geography ==
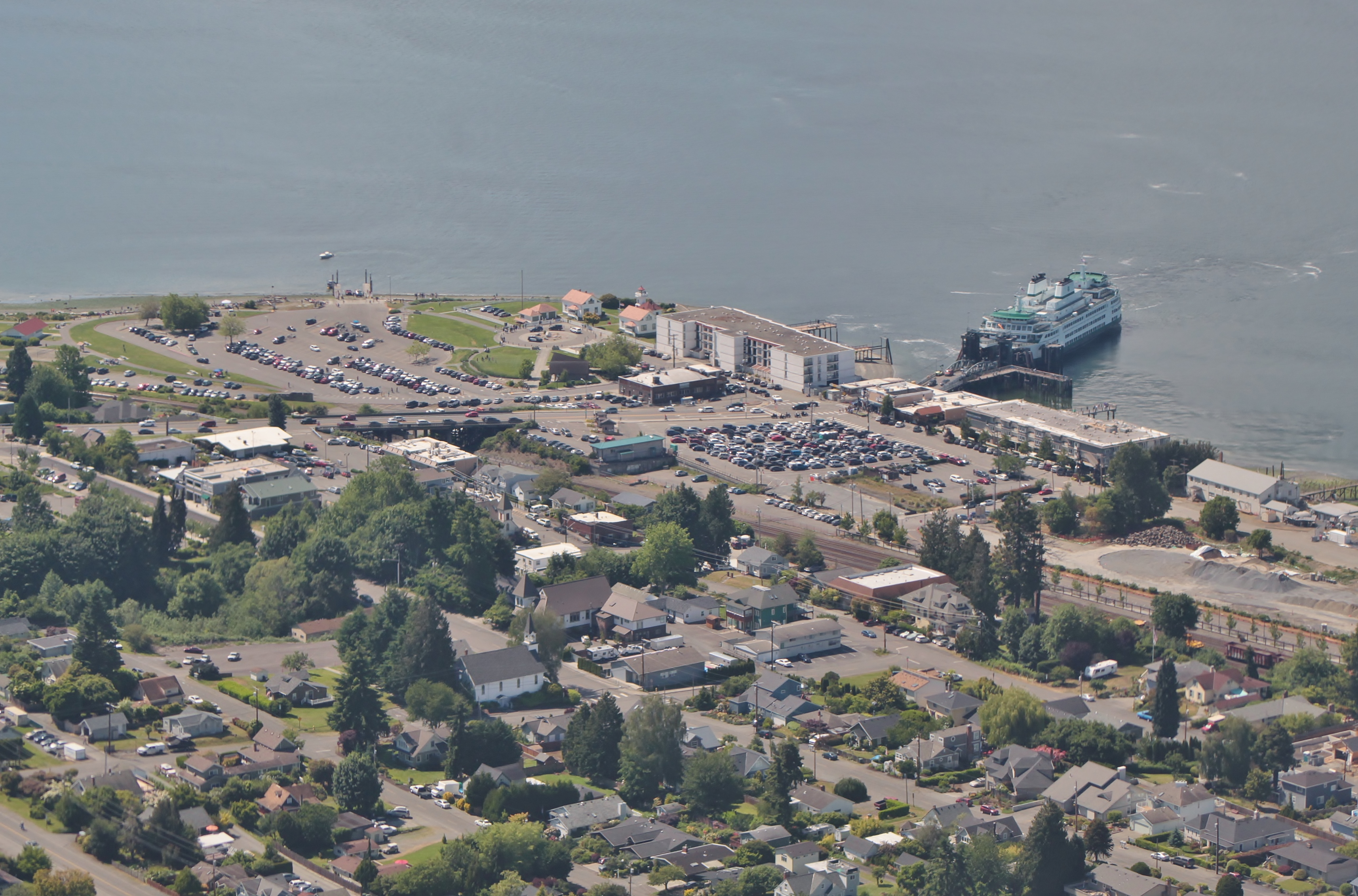
Aerial view of Mukilteo's downtown waterfront in 2019, featuring the former ferry terminal

Mukilteo is located in southwestern Snohomish County, approximately 25 miles (40 km) north of Seattle. The city generally runs north–south, with a length of 5.4 miles (8.7 km) and a width of 0.8 to 2.1 miles (1.3 to 3.4 km). It is bordered to the west by Possession Sound, a section of Puget Sound, and to the north by Port Gardner Bay. Mukilteo's eastern border with Everett is defined by 44th Avenue and Japanese Gulch until it reaches State Route 526. From there, the city's eastern boundary continues along State Route 525 along the western and southern sides of Paine Field in unincorporated Snohomish County. Mukilteo's southern border, also facing unincorporated neighborhoods, is defined by Beverly Park Road, the Picnic Point Ravine, and Hulk Creek, which drains into Possession Sound.

According to the United States Census Bureau, the city has a total area of 9.50 square miles (24.60 km^{2}), of which 6.40 square miles (16.58 km^{2}) is land and 3.10 square miles (8.03 km^{2}) is water. Mukilteo also has a designated urban growth area that extends south to 148th Street Southwest, bordering Lynnwood, and east to State Route 99. An advisory vote on whether to annex the entire urban growth area (with a population of 11,000 people) was rejected by city voters in 2010.

The majority of Mukilteo is located on a plateau overlooking Possession Sound and the Olympic Mountains to the west and Port Gardner Bay to the north. A major railroad runs along the shore, which is situated below a set of tall bluffs that are divided by ravines and gulches along several creeks. The bluffs were formed approximately 5,000 years before present and eroded away over time to form beaches and Point Elliott itself. The city has several recognized drainage basins, including Japanese Gulch, Big Gulch, the Chennault Ravines, and Picnic Point Gulch. Mukilteo is also traversed from northwest to southeast by the Southern Whidbey Island Fault, a shallow earthquake fault zone discovered in 1996.

=== Neighborhoods ===
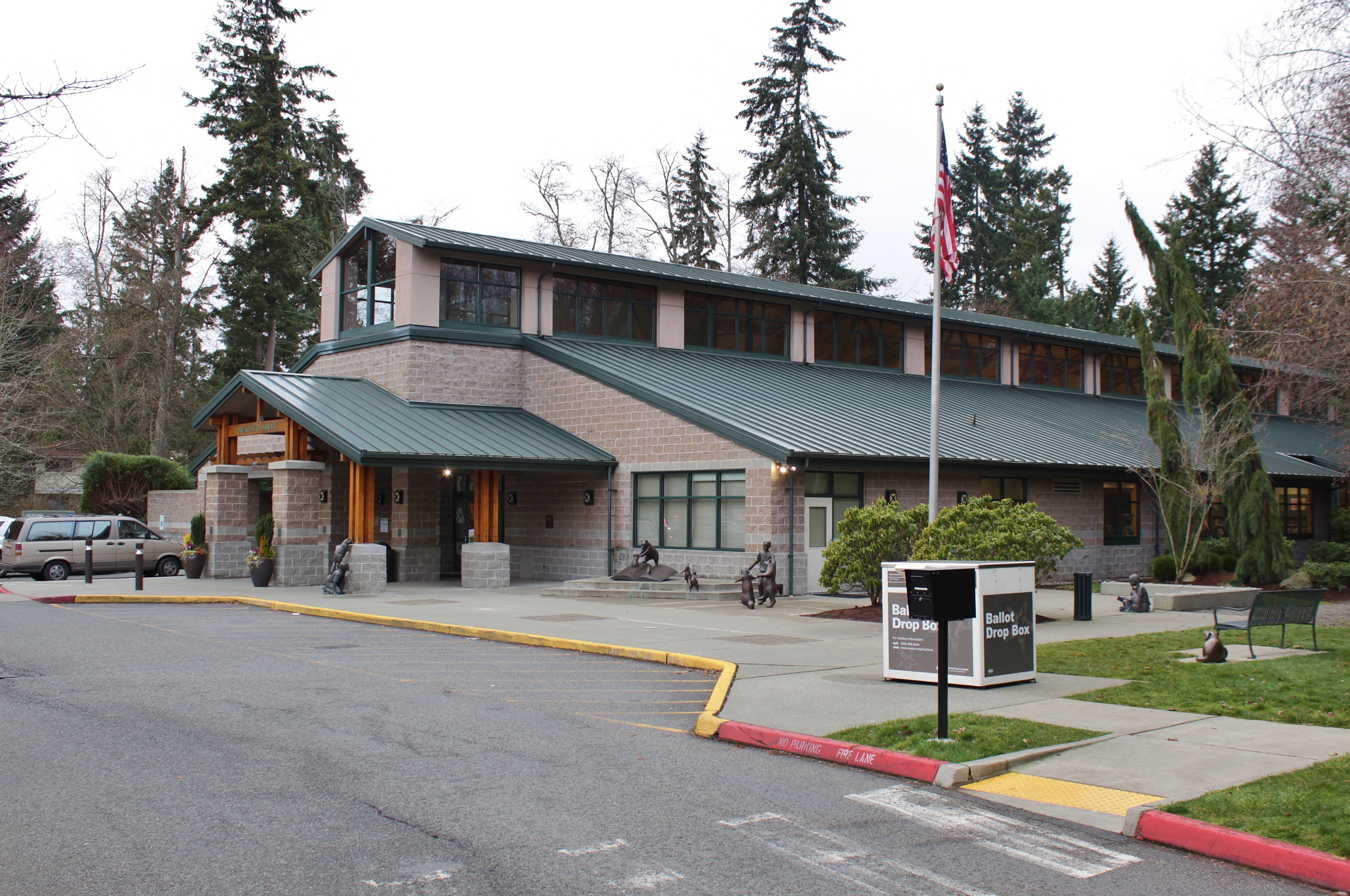
The Mukilteo public library, located in Harbour Pointe and operated by Sno-Isle Libraries

With the exception of Old Town Mukilteo, the city is divided into several large neighborhoods that are named for various developed subdivisions that were annexed in the late 20th century. Among these subdivision neighborhoods are Chennault Beach, Harbour Pointe, Olympus Terrace, and Picnic Point. Mukilteo's urban growth area includes the neighborhoods of Lake Serene, Meadowdale, and Lake Stickney.

Old Town Mukilteo is located at the north end of the city, between Port Gardner Bay and 5th Street (Mukilteo Boulevard). The city's landmark lighthouse is located on Point Elliott at the northwest corner of Old Town, adjacent to the Washington State Ferries terminal and commuter train station. The waterfront's sole connection to the rest of Mukilteo is via the Mukilteo Speedway (State Route 525), which also serves ferry traffic; a second street, Mukilteo Lane, was closed in 2008 after severe erosion was discovered along the road.

Mukilteo's largest neighborhood is Harbour Pointe, located on 2,341 acres (947 ha) in the south-central part of the city between Possession Sound and State Route 525. It is bordered to the south by South Gulch and Picnic Point and to the north by Big Gulch and Olympus Terrace. The site was originally owned by the Port Gamble Lumber Company and was sold to Standard Oil in 1952 as part of a plan to build an oil refinery at Picnic Point. After protests over a similar proposal for Kayak Point in the 1960s, Standard Oil abandoned plans to build refineries in Snohomish County and turned over the Picnic Point site to the county government and private real estate developers. Development of Harbour Pointe began in 1978 and its first phase was completed in 1989 with the opening of the neighborhood's golf course. A public marina was proposed for the development's Chenault Beach section in 1983, but was rejected due to concerns from fisheries officials over potential impacts on Indian fishing. Harbour Pointe was annexed by Mukilteo in 1991 and is now home to Kamiak High School, the city library, and a large industrial district.

=== Climate ===
Mukilteo has a general climate similar to most of the Puget Sound lowlands, with dry summers and mild, rainy winters moderated by a marine influence from the Pacific Ocean. On average, the area gets 38.55 inches (979 mm) of annual precipitation, spread over approximately seven months. Mukilteo lies within the Puget Sound Convergence Zone, a local weather phenomenon that affects areas of Snohomish County.

Climate data for Mukilteo, Washington
Month	Jan	Feb	Mar	Apr	May	Jun	Jul	Aug	Sep	Oct	Nov	Dec	Year
Record high °F (°C)	67 (19)	74 (23)	82 (28)	85 (29)	93 (34)	103 (39)	93 (34)	94 (34)	89 (32)	80 (27)	74 (23)	66 (19)	103 (39)
Mean daily maximum °F (°C)	48 (9)	51 (11)	55 (13)	60 (16)	65 (18)	70 (21)	75 (24)	75 (24)	70 (21)	61 (16)	52 (11)	46 (8)	61 (16)
Mean daily minimum °F (°C)	35 (2)	34 (1)	37 (3)	41 (5)	46 (8)	51 (11)	54 (12)	54 (12)	49 (9)	42 (6)	38 (3)	33 (1)	43 (6)
Record low °F (°C)	1 (−17)	2 (−17)	10 (−12)	27 (−3)	29 (−2)	37 (3)	39 (4)	40 (4)	31 (−1)	22 (−6)	0 (−18)	5 (−15)	0 (−18)
Average precipitation inches (mm)	5.11 (130)	3.19 (81)	3.69 (94)	3.00 (76)	2.67 (68)	2.30 (58)	1.17 (30)	1.15 (29)	1.95 (50)	3.58 (91)	5.57 (141)	5.17 (131)	38.55 (979)
Source: The Weather Channel

== Economy ==
Mukilteo is primarily a bedroom community, with a concentration of employers at an industrial park near Harbour Pointe and several small office parks. The Puget Sound Regional Council estimated that the city had a total of 10,557 jobs as of 2017, with the largest share in the manufacturing and services sectors. The largest employer in Mukilteo is the Mukilteo School District, followed by the Boeing Technical Center in Harbour Pointe, with over 1,200 employees. Mukilteo also has several companies that are headquartered or based in the city, including aerospace equipment manufacturing firm Electroimpact, audio equipment manufacturer Rane, furniture manufacturer Kaas Tailored, laser manufacturer Synrad, and stovemaker Travis Industries. Space systems manufacturer Karman Space & Defense has a manufacturing facility in Mukilteo that was created when the company acquired Systima Technologies in 2021. Local restaurant chain Ivar's has a large soup and chowder plant in Mukilteo that supplies restaurants and retailers.

As of 2015, Mukilteo has an estimated workforce population of 16,935 and an unemployment rate of 6.7 percent. Under 7 percent of the city's workers have jobs located within Mukilteo city limits, with the majority commuting to employers in other cities. Over 26 percent of workers commute to Everett, home to the Boeing Assembly Plant and the county government. An estimated 19 percent travel to Seattle, 6 percent to Bellevue, and 5 percent to Lynnwood.

== Demographics ==
Historical population
Census	Pop.	Note	%±
1950	826		—
1960	1,128		36.6%
1970	1,369		21.4%
1980	1,426		4.2%
1990	7,007		391.4%
2000	18,019		157.2%
2010	20,254		12.4%
2020	21,538		6.3%
2024 (est.)	21,299		−1.1%
U.S. Decennial Census

Mukilteo is the ninth largest city in Snohomish County, with a population of 21,538 at the time of the 2020 census. The city has a significant population of Asian American residents, which began growing in the late 1980s. It is one of the most affluent suburbs of Seattle and has a median household income of $94,863 and a per capita income of $44,690, ranking 21st of 281 areas within the state. Approximately 4.9 percent of families and 5.7 percent of the overall population were below the poverty line, including 9.3 percent of those under the age of 18 and 4 percent aged 65 or older.

The city was ranked 10th on a list of top 100 small U.S. towns to live in by Money magazine in 2009, based on quality of life criteria. Mukilteo rose to ninth place in the magazine's 2011 list, becoming the only West Coast city in the top 10. Mukilteo was previously recognized in 2006 by BusinessWeek magazine as one of the best affordable suburbs due to lower housing prices compared to King County cities and its low crime rate.

=== 2020 census ===
As of the 2020 census, there were 21,538 people and 8,389 households living in Mukilteo, which had a population density of 3,442.2 inhabitants per square mile (1,329.0/km^{2}). There were 8,711 total housing units, of which 96.3% were occupied and 3.7% were vacant or for occasional use. The racial makeup of the city was 64.3% White, 0.5% Native American and Alaskan Native, 2.5% Black or African American, 19.6% Asian, and 0.2% Native Hawaiian and Pacific Islander. Residents who listed another race were 2.9% of the population and those who identified as more than one race were 9.9% of the population. Hispanic or Latino residents of any race were 7.3% of the population.

Of the 8,389 households in Mukilteo, 57.6% were married couples living together and 5.7% were cohabitating but unmarried. Households with a male householder with no spouse or partner were 15.4% of the population, while households with a female householder with no spouse or partner were 21.3% of the population. Out of all households, 30.8% had children under the age of 18 living with them and 30.3% had residents who were 65 years of age or older. There were 8,389 occupied housing units in Mukilteo, of which 69.0% were owner-occupied and 31.0% were occupied by renters.

The median age in the city was 44.0 years old for all sexes, 42.6 years old for males, and 45.0 years old for females. Of the total population, 23.0% of residents were under the age of 19; 22.2% were between the ages of 20 and 39; 37.6% were between the ages of 40 and 64; and 17.2% were 65 years of age or older. The gender makeup of the city was 49.4% male and 50.6% female.

=== 2010 census ===
As of the 2010 census, there were 20,254 people, 8,057 households, and 5,660 families residing in the city of Mukilteo. The population density was 3,164.7 inhabitants per square mile (1,221.9/km^{2}). There were 8,547 housing units at an average density of 1,335.5 per square mile (515.6/km^{2}). The racial makeup of the city was 74.9% White, 1.7% African American, 0.6% Native American, 17.1% Asian, 0.2% Pacific Islander, 1.1% from other races, and 4.5% from two or more races. Hispanic or Latino of any race were 4.4% of the population.

There were 8,057 households, of which 34.1% had children under the age of 18 living with them, 57.9% were married couples living together, 8.9% had a female householder with no husband present, 3.5% had a male householder with no wife present, and 29.8% were non-families. 23.9% of all households were made up of individuals, and 5.7% had someone living alone who was 65 years of age or older. The average household size was 2.51 and the average family size was 3.00.

The median age in the city was 41.8 years. 23.2% of residents were under the age of 18; 7.9% were between the ages of 18 and 24; 23.9% were from 25 to 44; 34.5% were from 45 to 64; and 10.6% were 65 years of age or older. The gender makeup of the city was 50.2% male and 49.8% female.

== Government and politics ==
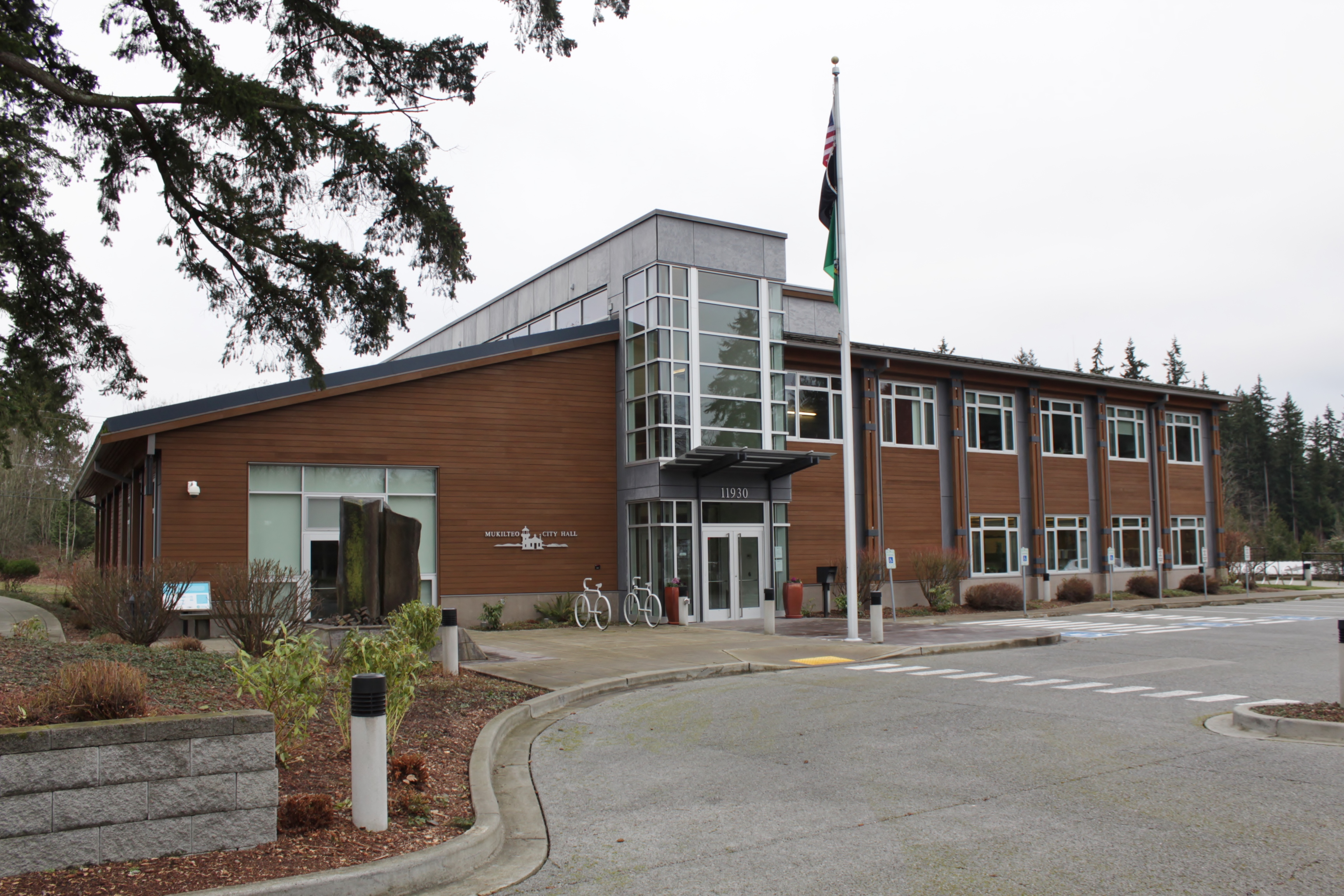
Mukilteo's city hall, opened in 2008

The City of Mukilteo operates as a non-charter code city with a mayor–council government, consisting of a mayor and a seven-member city council who are elected to four-year terms. Elections for the at-large positions are held in odd-numbered years and conducted in a nonpartisan manner, with city council seats staggered for a maximum of four seats per election. Joe Marine, a former city councilmember, is in his fourth term as mayor of Mukilteo. He was elected in 2005 and served two terms until losing in 2013; Marine then returned to the office in 2021 and won re-election in 2025. Management of the city government was also delegated to a full-time city administrator until the position was eliminated in 2014. A proposal to create the position of city manager and change to a council–manager form of government was rejected by voters in the November 2019 elections.

The city government has 113 full-time employees and operated in 2016 on a budget of $32 million that is predominantly funded by sales taxes. As of 2024, the combined sales tax rate in Mukilteo is 10.6 percent, tied for the highest in Washington. Mukilteo maintains its own police and fire services, as well as departments for recreation, planning, and public works. Other services, including utilities, garbage collection, public transportation, and the library, are contracted to regional agencies and organizations. Mukilteo's city hall is located in Harbour Pointe and was constructed in 2008, costing $8.5 million and integrating recycled materials and other environmentally friendly features. The city hall was formerly housed at the Rosehill Community Center in Old Town and was temporarily moved to a leased Harbour Pointe warehouse in 1992 to accommodate more employees. After initially approving a site near the Rosehill Center in Old Town, the city government chose the Harbour Pointe site in 2006 as a compromise between disagreeing factions of the city council.

At the federal level, Mukilteo has been part of the 2nd congressional district since 2012 and is represented by Democrat Rick Larsen. The district includes most of western Snohomish County along with Island, Skagit, and Whatcom counties. Prior to post-census redistricting in 2012, Mukilteo was part of the 1st congressional district. At the state level, the city and Edmonds comprise the 21st legislative district, which also includes unincorporated areas north of Lynnwood. Mukilteo is wholly part of the Snohomish County Council's 2nd district, which also covers Everett and the Tulalip Indian Reservation.

== Culture ==
=== Events ===
The city's main annual festival is the three-day Mukilteo Lighthouse Festival, held at Mukilteo Lighthouse Park in late August or early September. It was established in 1965 and features a parade, fireworks, a fishing derby, and fun runs. The city also organizes a farmers' market at Mukilteo Lighthouse Park that runs on weekends during the summer months; the 2019 season of the farmers' market was canceled due to a shortage of volunteers and a declined request for city officials to take over the event.

=== Parks and recreation ===
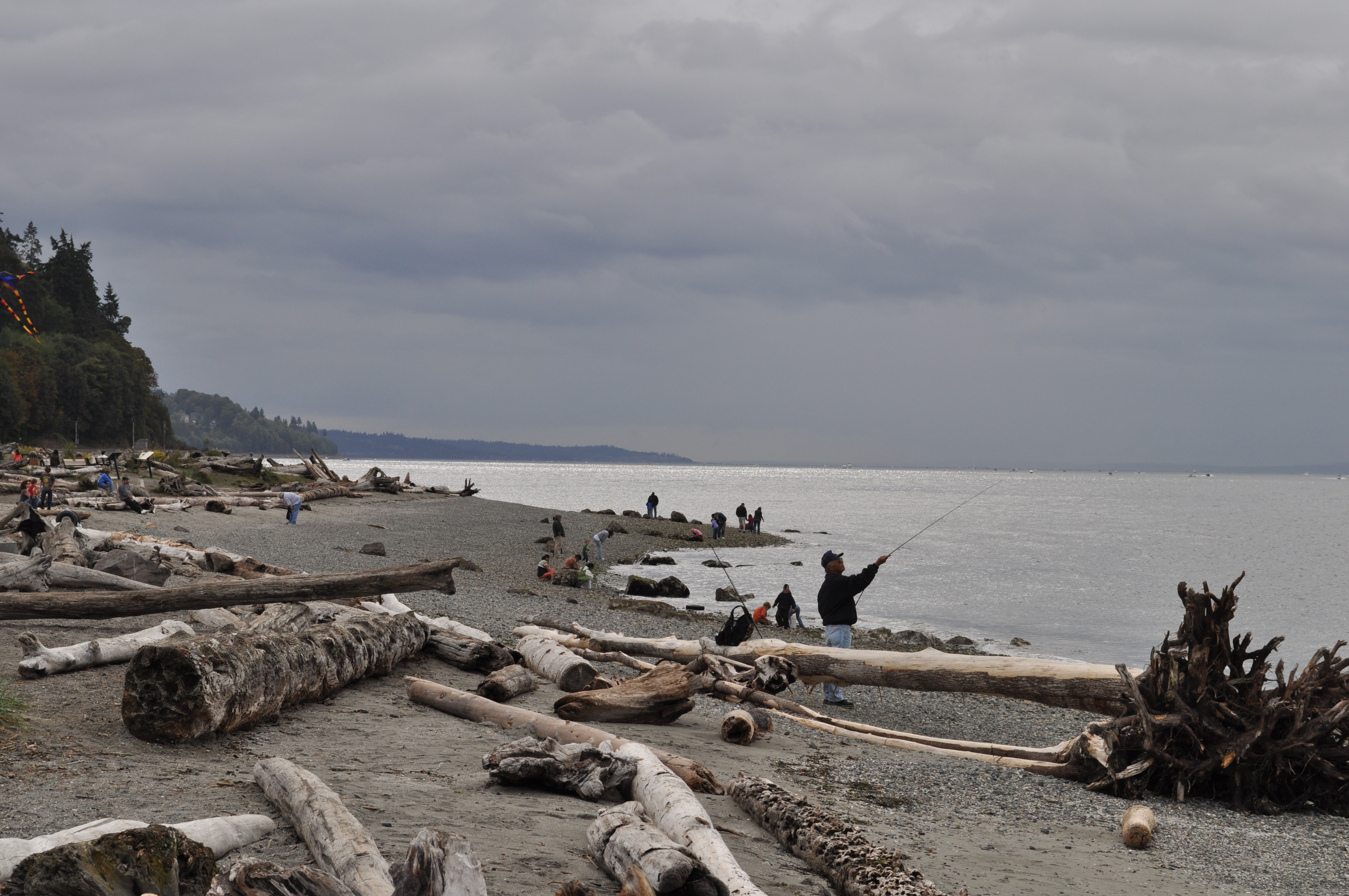
A coastal beach at Mukilteo Lighthouse Park

Mukilteo has 1,154 acres (467 ha) of total open space, including 611 acres (247 ha) of public parks and 342 acres (138 ha) of privately owned open spaces, that occupy 13 percent of the city's total land area. The city's largest open spaces are conservation areas in the Big Gulch and Japanese Gulch drainage basins. Mukilteo's parks are maintained by a city department that is also tasked with organizing recreational programs for citizens; it was funded by a 1996 ballot measure that was approved by voters. In addition to city-owned parks and public spaces, Mukilteo is also located near Picnic Point Park, a 54-acre (22 ha) county park along Puget Sound southwest of Harbour Pointe.

The Old Town neighborhood has several of the city's major parks, including Mukilteo Lighthouse Park, a former state park that was acquired by Mukilteo in 2003 and is the city's most-used park facility. The 12-acre (4.9 ha) park includes a beach, boat launch, playground, and picnic areas. To the southeast of the waterfront park is the Rosehill Community Center, the city's main multi-purpose recreation center. It was built in 2011 to replace the existing community center, a former school that opened in 1928 and was re-purposed for various uses between the 1970s and its demolition in 2010.

The Japanese Gulch conservation area, located between Old Town and Paine Field, is the most-used natural area in Mukilteo. The 144-acre (58 ha) area is predominately forests and wetlands that are home to a variety of birds, as well as salmon, deer, and mountain beavers. It has several hiking trails that were developed by Japanese immigrants who settled in the gulch in the early 20th century. The city government acquired land in the gulch in stages between 1996 and 2014. A park with dirt tracks for BMX bikes was opened at the southwest end of Japanese Gulch in 2024.

The city's largest conservation area, Big Gulch, is located near Harbour Pointe and comprises 180 acres (73 ha) of protected land and 2.5 miles (4.0 km) of trails. At the northeast corner of Big Gulch is Mukilteo's largest neighborhood park, 92nd Street Park, which spans 13 acres (5.3 ha) along the Mukilteo Speedway. It includes two playgrounds, hiking trails, and picnic tables.

=== Media ===
Mukilteo's public library is operated by the inter-county Sno-Isle Libraries system and is located in Harbour Pointe. It was opened on July 27, 1998, after the city's voters approved an annexation into the library system with a $2.8 million bond in 1996. Mukilteo's original library opened on October 19, 1963, replacing an earlier bookmobile that was run by one of Sno-Isle's predecessors until the city was incorporated. It closed on December 31, 1994, due to budget cuts and the defeat of a city levy to fund its operations. Prior to its formal annexation into the Sno-Isle system in 1996, Mukilteo had also considered contracting with a private library operator or joining the Everett Public Library system.

The city's main newspaper is the Mukilteo Beacon, a weekly publication first issued on July 22, 1992; it has sister papers in Edmonds and Mill Creek. Mukilteo is also covered by The Everett Herald and The Seattle Times, the region's daily newspapers.

=== Notable people ===
- Anita Borg, computer scientist and philanthropist
- Heather Boushey, economist and presidential advisor
- Tim Eyman, political activist
- Marko Liias, state senator and former city councilmember
- James Mongrain, glass sculptor
- Lillian Ortiz-Self, state legislator
- Gina Segadelli, former soccer player and coach
- Brian Sullivan, former mayor and county councilman
- Andy Walken, actor
- Jim Watkins, businessman and owner of 8chan
- Ron Watkins, conspiracy theorist and former administrator of 8chan
- The Fall of Troy, post-hardcore band with members Thomas Erak, Andrew Forsman, and Tim Ward

== Education ==
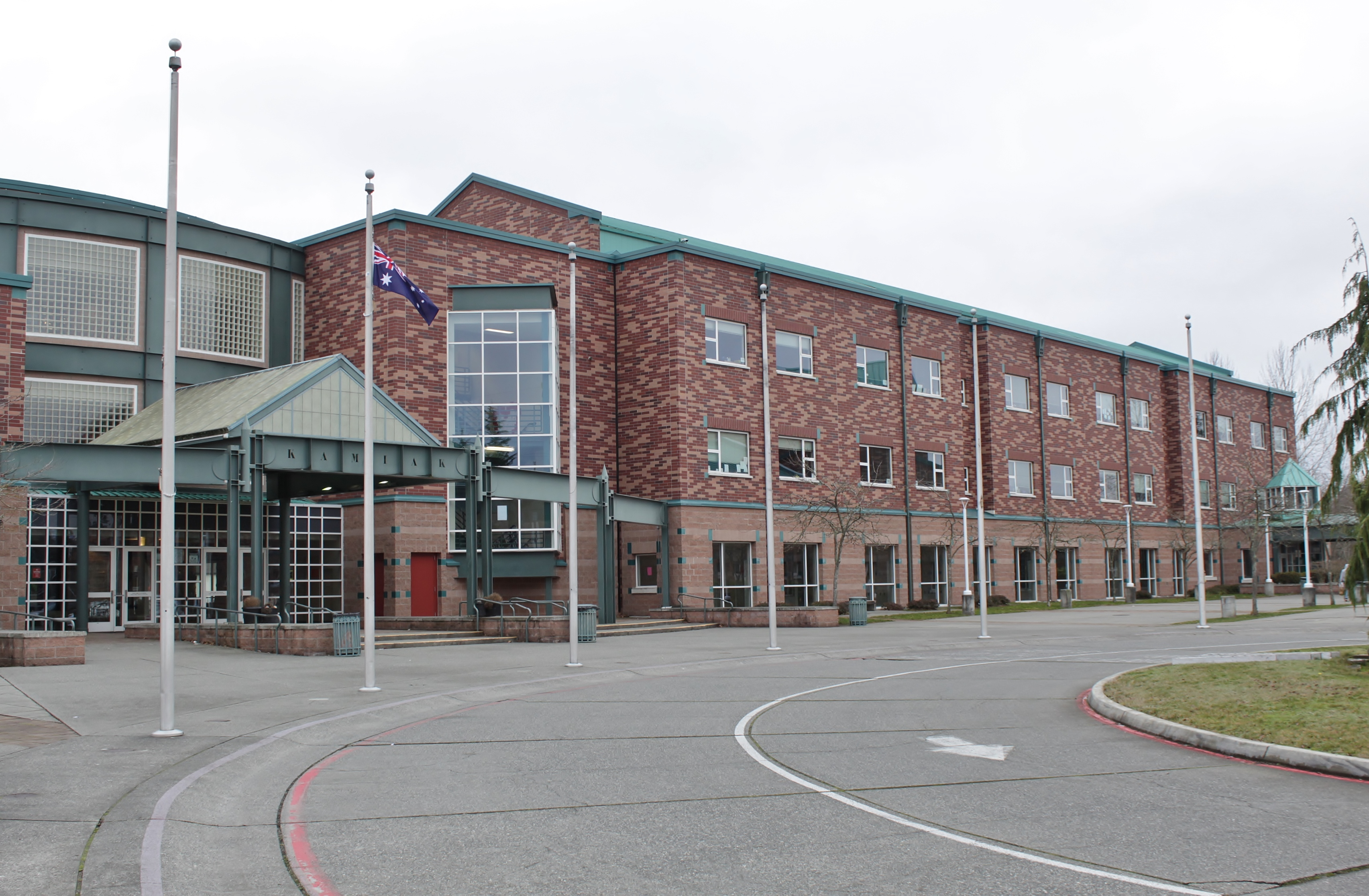
Kamiak High School, opened in 1993 and located in Harbour Pointe

The Mukilteo School District, established in 1878, manages the public school systems of Mukilteo and neighboring areas in south Everett and unincorporated Snohomish County. It serves a population of 93,222, or nearly quintuple the city population, across 26 square miles (67 km^{2}) and has a student enrollment of approximately 15,000. Seven of the district's 24 schools are located within Mukilteo city limits, including Kamiak High School, two middle schools, and four elementary schools. Kamiak High School opened in 1993 to relieve the overcrowded Mariner High School and boasts a high student graduation rate of 94 percent. Mukilteo is located near two community colleges—Edmonds and Everett—that offer two-year degree programs. The city also has three private schools catered towards preschool and kindergarten education.

== Infrastructure ==
=== Transportation ===
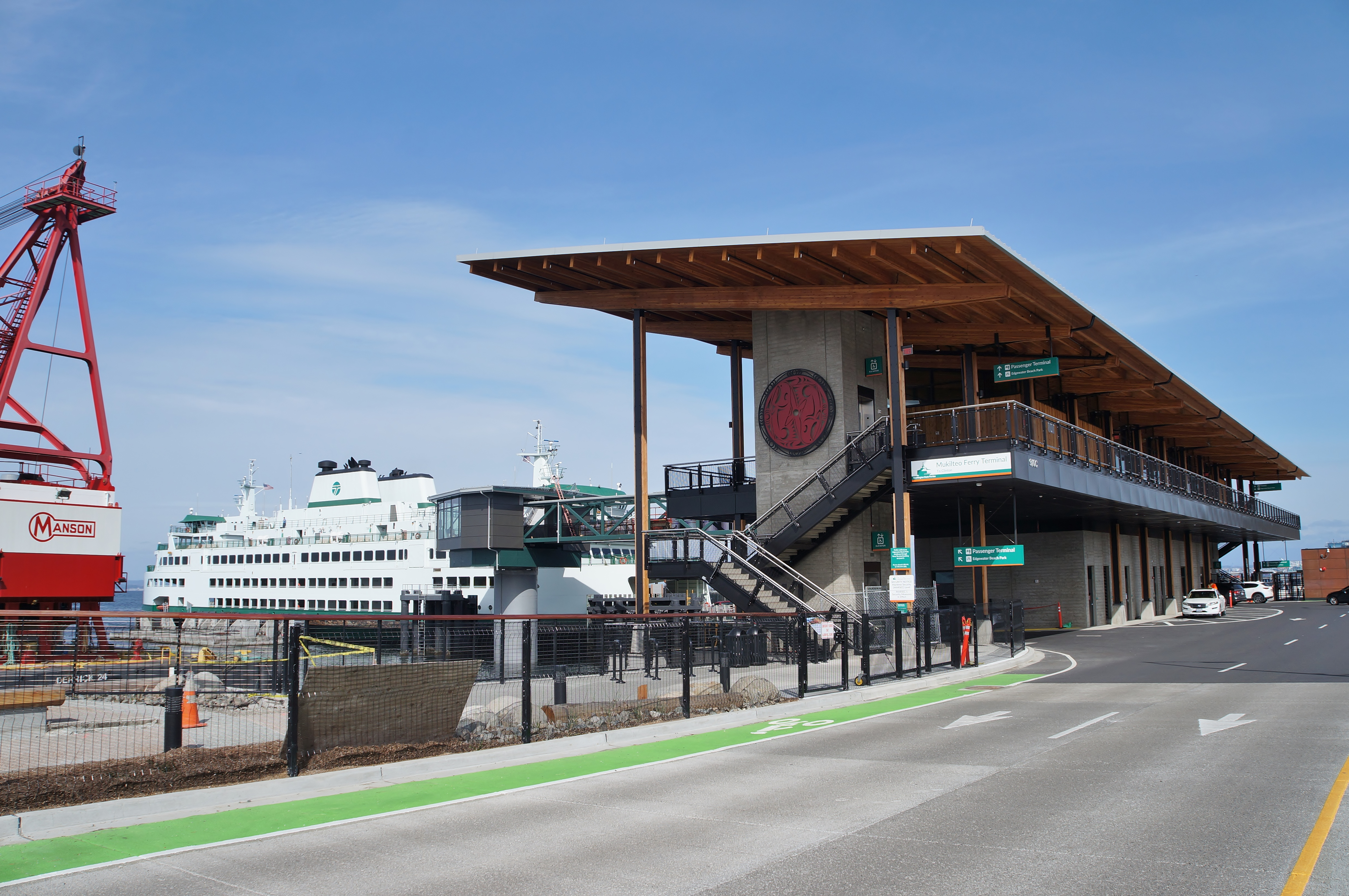
The Washington State Ferries terminal in downtown Mukilteo, opened in 2020 to replace a nearby facility

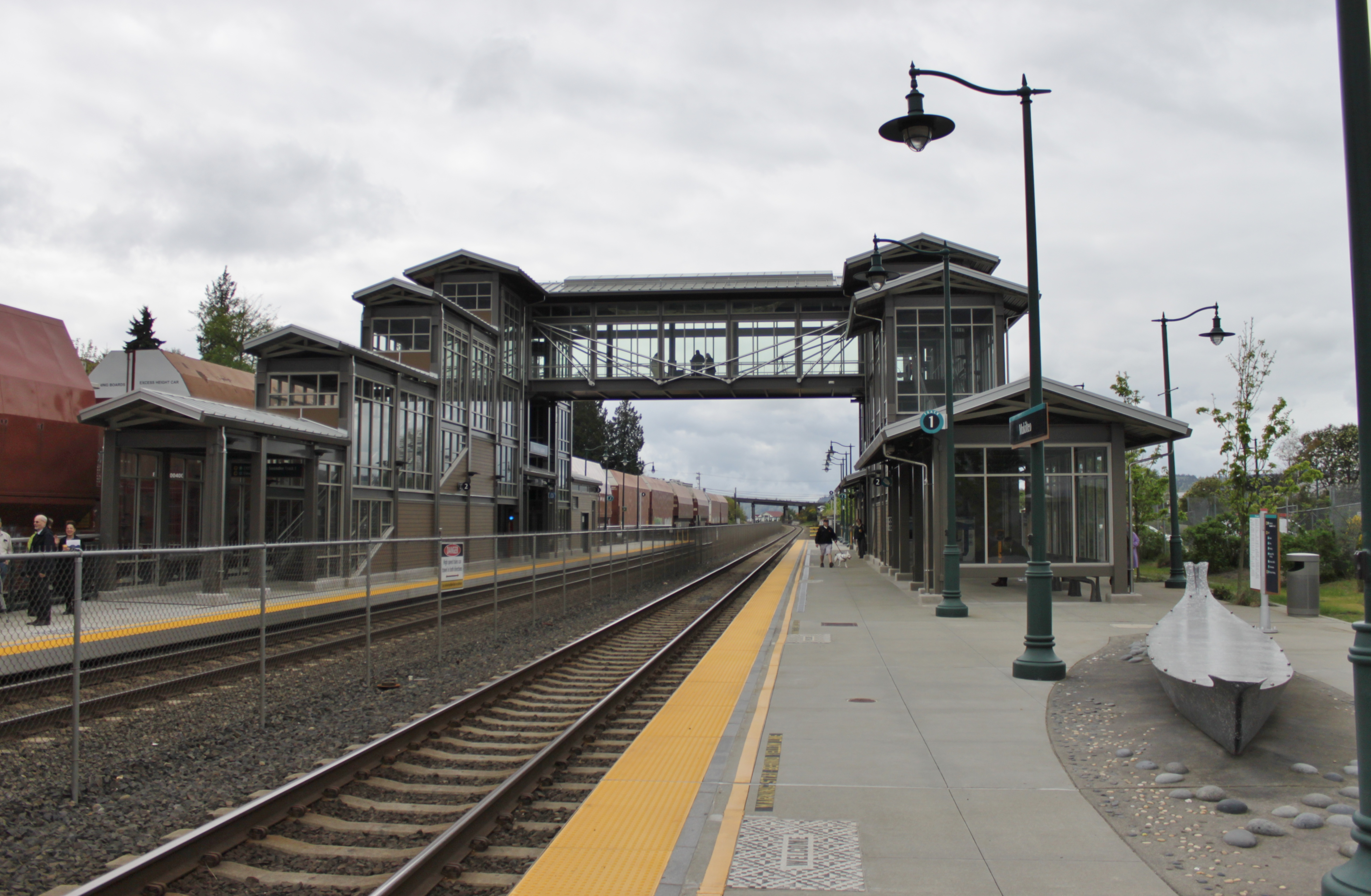
Mukilteo's commuter rail station, served by Sounder trains and located near the ferry terminal

Downtown Mukilteo is a multimodal transportation hub that is served by state highways, ferries, commuter trains, and buses. The city is bisected from north to south by State Route 525, also known as the Mukilteo Speedway, which connects the downtown ferry terminal to Harbour Pointe, State Route 99, and Interstate 5. State Route 526 (the Boeing Freeway) travels from west to east and provides direct connections to the Boeing Everett Factory and Interstate 5. Other major roads include Mukilteo Boulevard, which connects the city to Everett, and Harbour Pointe Boulevard, which encircles the eponymous neighborhood and golf course.

State Route 525 continues north from Mukilteo to Whidbey Island on the Clinton ferry, which is operated by Washington State Ferries. The Clinton–Mukilteo ferry route is the state's busiest for automobiles and second-busiest overall, carrying 4 million passengers and 2.2 million vehicles annually. The Mukilteo ferry terminal was built in 1952 and was replaced with a new terminal, which began construction in 2018 and opened on December 29, 2020.

The city is also served by three public transportation agencies: Sound Transit, which runs Sounder commuter trains from Mukilteo station to Seattle during peak periods on weekdays; and local buses operated by Community Transit and Everett Transit. Community Transit's buses include local routes connecting Mukilteo and Harbour Pointe to Lynnwood and the Boeing Everett Factory. Until 2024, it also ran direct express buses to Downtown Seattle. Everett Transit operates a single route in Mukilteo, connecting downtown and the ferry terminal to Everett via Mukilteo Boulevard. Mukilteo is the largest city in Snohomish County without a dedicated park and ride facility for Community Transit.

Paine Field is located southeast of Mukilteo and serves the Boeing Everett Factory, as well as general aviation and passenger flights, which resumed in 2019. The passenger terminal and general aviation facilities are located on the east side of the airport, facing Everett, while the west side in Mukilteo has the Future of Flight Aviation Center (which includes a tour of the Boeing factory) as well as the former building of the Historic Flight Foundation. The Mukilteo city government has opposed the airport's use for passenger flights since the 1990s, citing concerns about noise pollution and traffic congestion.

=== Utilities ===
Electric power in Mukilteo is provided by the Snohomish County Public Utility District (PUD), a consumer-owned public utility that serves all of Snohomish County. Puget Sound Energy provides natural gas service to the city's residents and businesses. The city government also contracts with Waste Management and Rubatino Refuse Removal for curbside garbage, recycling, and yard waste collection and disposal.

Mukilteo's tap water and sewage systems are managed by the Mukilteo Water and Wastewater District and the Alderwood Water District, two independent municipal corporations. The Mukilteo district, founded in 1920, serves most of the city and part of south Everett; the Alderwood district extends into Edmonds and Lynnwood. The city government formerly operated its own sewage treatment plant and the wastewater system until contracting in the 1990s with the Olympus Terrace Sewer District, which was merged into the Mukilteo district in 2007. The Big Gulch Wastewater Plant near Harbour Pointe was opened in 1970 and now serves as the main outflow from Mukilteo and the rest of the water district.

Mukilteo has several telecommunications companies that provide telephone, cable television, and Internet service; they include Xfinity and Ziply Fiber, the latter of which built a fiber-optic network in the city in 2021. A major submarine communications cable system named Pacific Crossing (operated by TE Connectivity) uses fiber-optic cables that travel from Mukilteo and Grover Beach, California, to the Japanese cities of Hitachinaka and Shima. The cable's switching center is in Harbour Pointe and was equipped to provide 80 gigabytes per second for data transfers by the late 1990s.

=== Health care ===
Mukilteo is located near two general hospitals: the Providence Regional Medical Center in Everett and Swedish Edmonds Hospital in Edmonds.
