= Japanese Gulch =

Drainage basin in Washington state, U.S.

Coordinates: 47°56′33″N 122°17′22″W

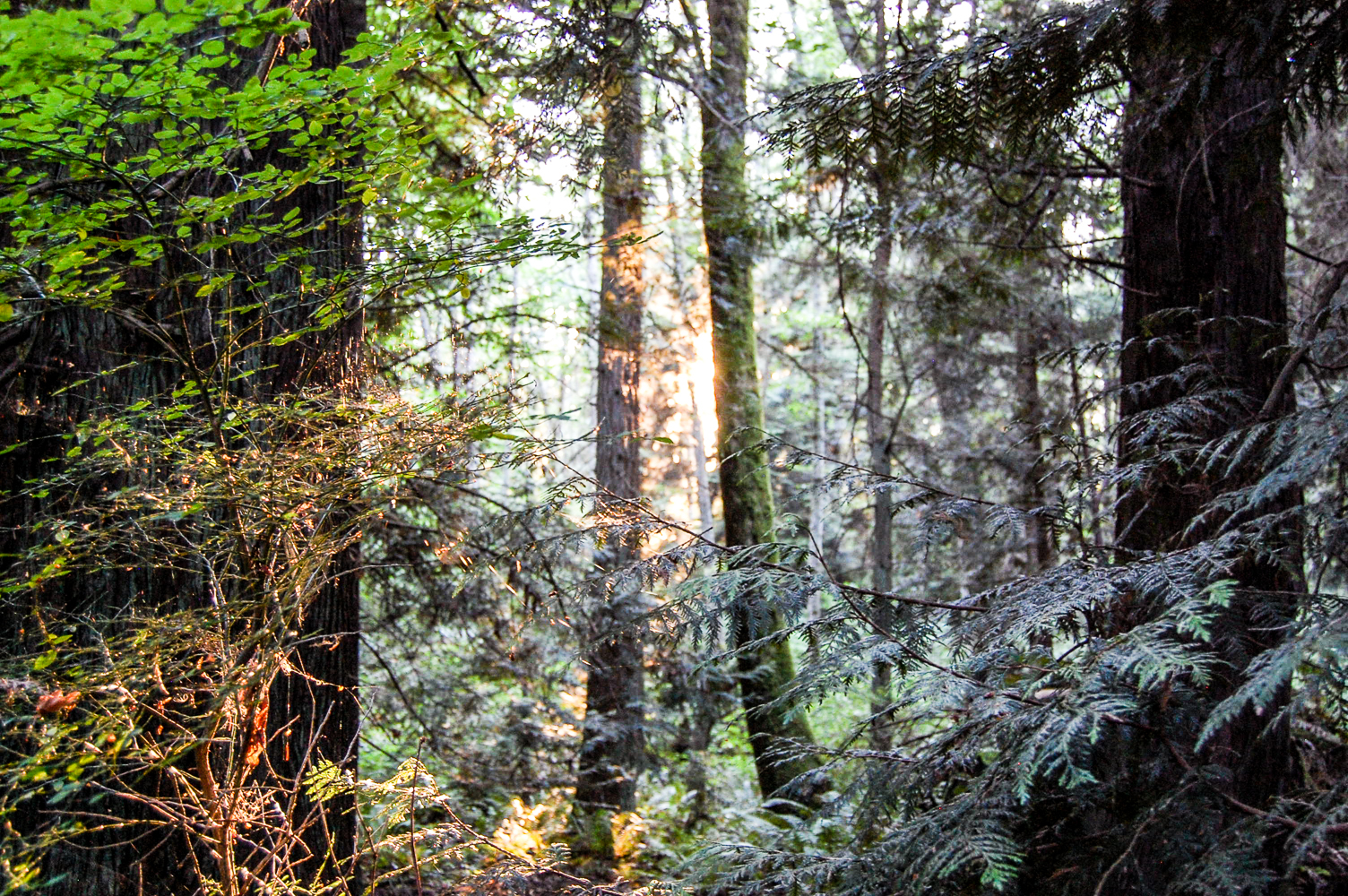
Japanese Gulch at Sunset

Japanese Gulch, is a 1,071-acre (4.33 km^{2}) drainage basin located in Snohomish County, Washington. Within the drainage basin, the City of Mukilteo owns 147 acres of land including a dog park, waterfront access, open space, and a community garden.

== History ==
In 1903, the Mukilteo Lumber Company (later, the Crown Lumber Company) was established and continued its operations until 1930. Many of its workers were Japanese immigrants who, with their families, lived in company housing in what became known as "Jap Gulch," later changed to "Japan Gulch" and "Japanese Gulch." Most of the Japanese workers moved away when the Crown Lumber Company closed.

World War II created the incentive to use Paine Field and Japanese Gulch as a defense position to protect the Bremerton Shipyard and the Boeing plant in Seattle. After World War II had ended, militarization ended and the Boeing plant at Paine Field was developed, a railroad was constructed in 1968 in order to carry materials to and from the Boeing plant. This railroad spur is the steepest standard gauge railroad in the United States with a 5.6% incline. This divided Japanese Gulch into two. The gulch was also considered for a potential extension of Paine Field Boulevard (SR 525 Spur) in the 2000s.

In late 2007 a development company bid on purchasing the property for developing an industrial park. This caused a small outcry from the community, and inspired a movement to save the gulch from being developed.

In 2014, the City of Mukilteo completed a purchase for 98 acres of the property from the Metropolitan Creditors Trust of Coeur d'Alene for $5.4 million, preserving the park for the public.

== Wildlife ==
The Gulch is home to a variety of wildlife including pileated woodpeckers, black-tailed deer, great blue heron, and coyotes.

== Japanese Gulch Fish passage design and habitat restoration ==
From June 2009 to December 2010, the City of Mukilteo teamed up with the Confluence Environmental Company (CEC) to deal with the issue of upstream fish passage in Japanese Gulch. A stream and watershed assessment were conducted in order to understand the barriers impeding upstream fish passage so that a plan could be created. They built fish ladders at multiple passage barrier locations that allowed for fish such as Coho salmon to be more easily able to travel upstream through raised culverts, and were able to do so at a fraction of the projected cost. The team also identified a historical channel which they were able to redirect back into its original channel, in effect doubling the length of the channel and creating more habitat for fish.
