= Kaas Tailored =

American furniture company

- Formerly: Kaasco International, Inc., Kaasco Inc.
- Founded: 1974 in Everett, Washington, United States
- Founders: Larry Kaas and Allan Kaas
- Headquarters: 13000 Beverly Park Rd., Mukilteo, Washington, United States
- Owners: Jeff and Stacey Kaas
- Number of employees: 200
- Website: kaastailored.com

Kaas Tailored is an American furniture and upholstery manufacturer based in Mukilteo, Washington. The company primarily creates commercial furnishings and aerospace furniture.

== Background and history ==
=== 1974-2019 ===
Kaas Tailored was founded by cousins Larry and Allan Kaas in 1974 under the name Kaasco International, Inc. The company operated out of an old barracks building at Boeing's Paine Field. The cousins later had a falling out, and in 1980 Larry Kaas reformed the company on his own, naming it Kaasco, Inc. In 1981, Nordstrom placed its first order with Kaasco, and the company began providing furniture for Nordstrom's shoe department. In 1984, Kaasco began producing for the aerospace industry, and in 1985, Larry Kaas bought out his business partner. Larry Kaas' son, Jeff Kaas, joined the company in 1989 as the director of marketing. Kassco moved to Mukilteo, Washington in 1992, after Tramco, an aircraft maintenance company needed to expand at Paine Field. Around the same time, the company became one of the first to give away free scraps of stuffing and fabrics to local artists involved in the Snohomish County industry-to-art movement, which focused on sustainability and recycling. The company was the biggest contributor to the movement, after one of its receptionists noticed the large amount of wasted materials, saving Kaasco over $3,000 in landfill fees in 1992. In 1995, Kaasco became the primary supplier of curtains for all of Boeing's commercial airplane models. Jeff Kaas eventually became the general manager, growing the company from eight employees to sixty-eight employees by March 1997 and getting named Boeing Supplier of the Year in 1996. At that time, the company was producing leather seats for first-class sections of Boeing airplanes, furnishings for Marathon Coach luxury recreational vehicles, and in-store furniture for Nordstrom and Niketown. In 1997, Jeff Kaas took over the company, and that same year, Kaasco received an award from Boeing for quality performance due to a one hundred percent on-time delivery record. In 2000, the company was renamed Kaas Tailored after the name caused confusion with Costco.

In the 1990s, Boeing, a client of Kaas Tailored's, adopted the Lean manufacturing philosophy and encouraged other companies to adopt the philosophy. In 1999, Jeff Kaas toured Toyota Motor Company factories in Japan which were using The Toyota Way. Kaas Tailored adopted kaizen principles at its factory. Kaas Tailored began providing tours to other companies such as Nordstrom, Starbucks, Boeing, Providence Medical Group, Amazon and Microsoft. In 2017, the company began providing consulting services for other companies such as Nordstrom.

=== 2020-present ===
In 2020, during the COVID-19 pandemic, Kaas Tailored was one of the first manufacturing companies to pivot from their usual operations to producing personal protective equipment. Kaas Tailored worked with Providence Medical Group to lead the "100 Million Mask Challenge." The company switched from making furniture to making masks and face shields for Providence Medical Group hospitals and Swedish Health Services. Kaas Tailored also sent a prototype to a company in Holland, who began making masks for its local hospitals. Jeff Kaas also coached health care systems in South Africa, Albania, Ireland, and the Netherlands in his model for manufacturing personal protective equipment. The prototype and instructions were also posted online along and sent to companies in 25 states so that others could join in to produce masks. Nordstrom worked with Kaas Tailored to begin producing masks at its factories as well. Kaas Tailored worked with partnership companies, Alaska Airlines and Boeing to ship personal protective equipment, and partnered with the Washington Aerospace Training and Research (WATR) Center at Edmonds College, which produced face shields. The company manufactured about 4,000 masks per day. In the last two weeks of March 2020, the company manufactured more than 100,000 masks and 30,000 face shields.

== Awards and recognition ==
- 1996 Boeing Supplier of the Year
- Business Journal's Covid Relief Champion Award for PPE
