= Mukilteo Lighthouse Park =

Local park with lighthouse in Mukilteo, Washington U.S.

Coordinates: 47°56′46.7″N 122°18′22.7″W

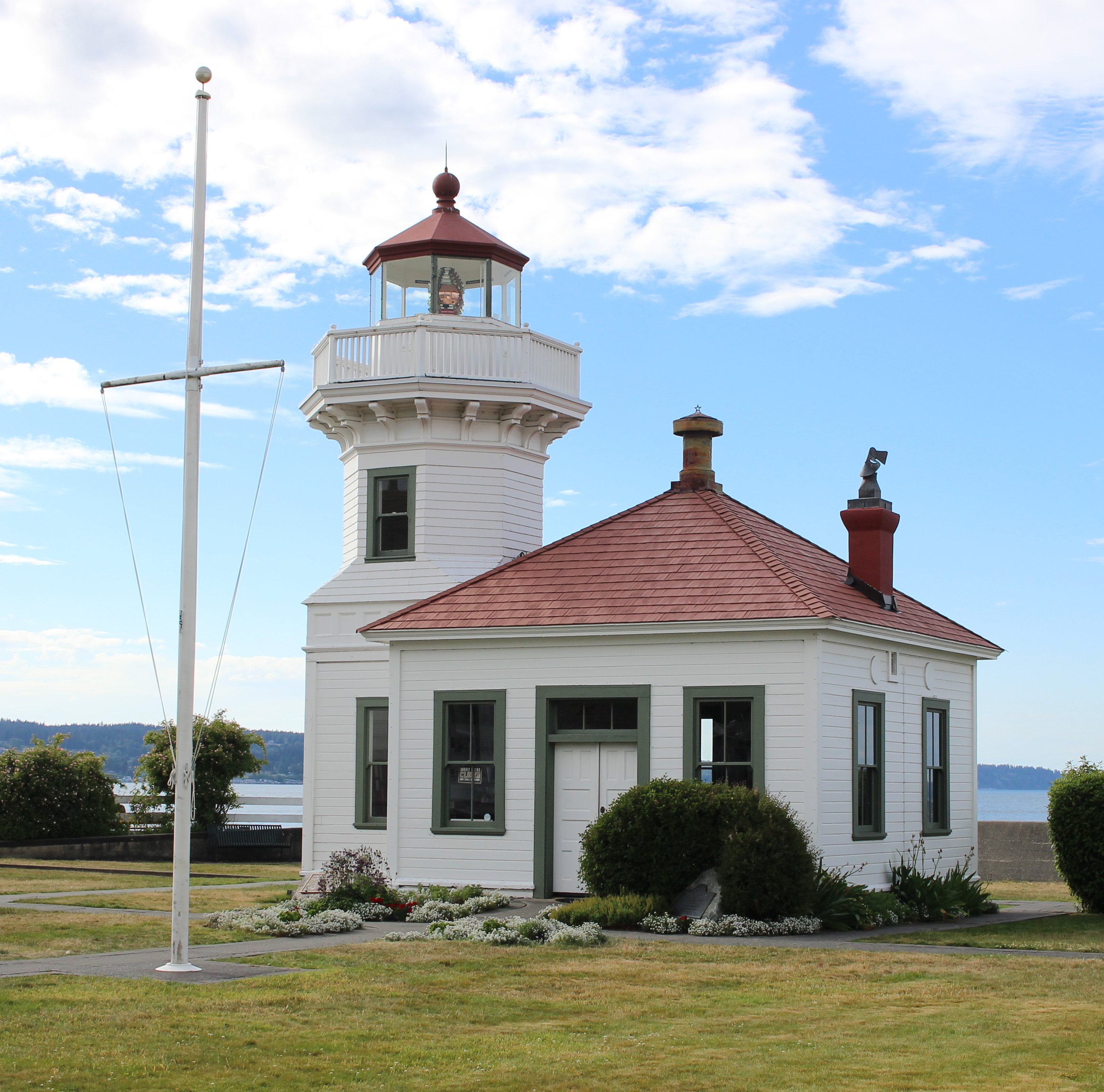
The light as of 2026

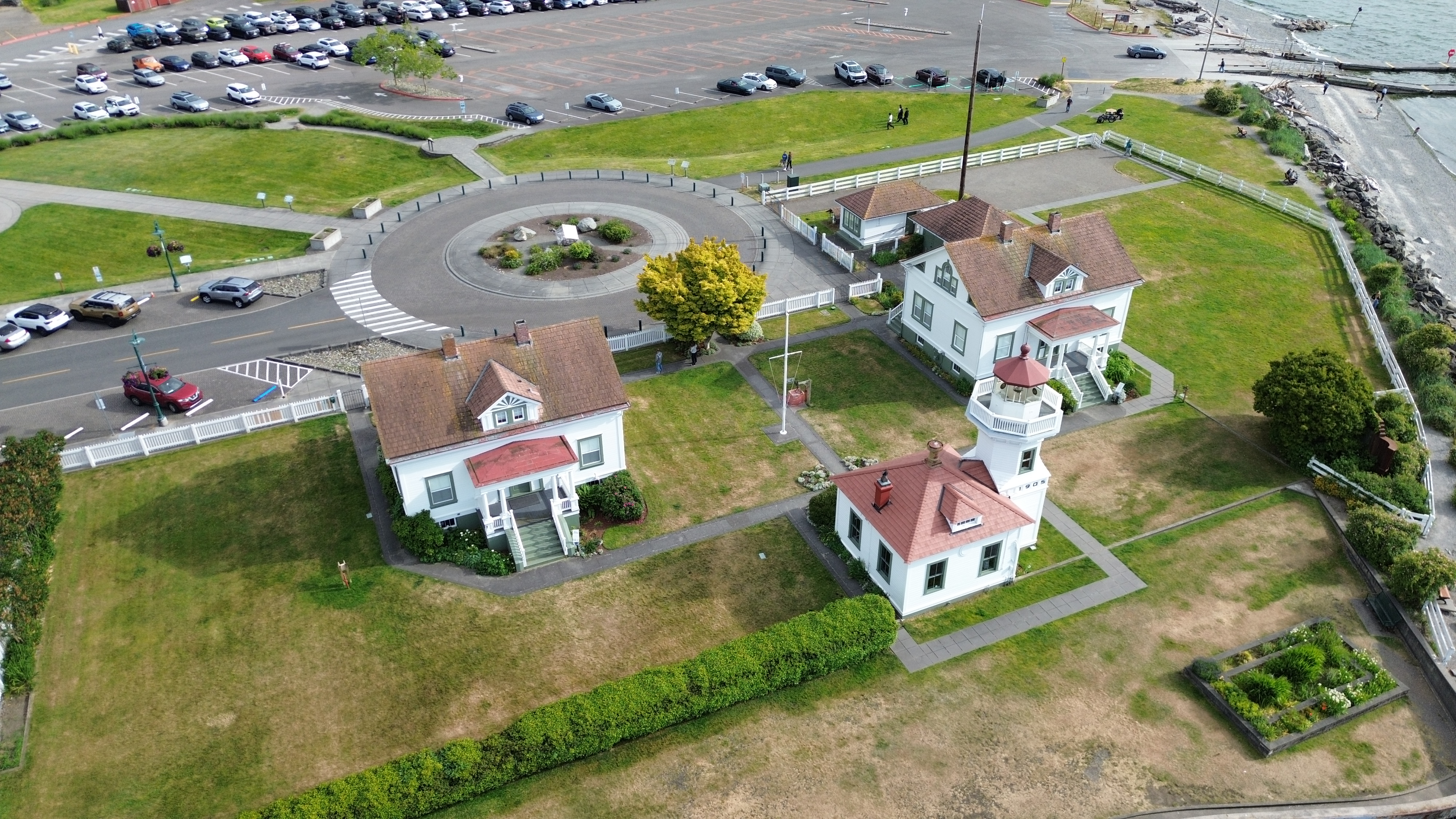
Lighthouse park and roundabout

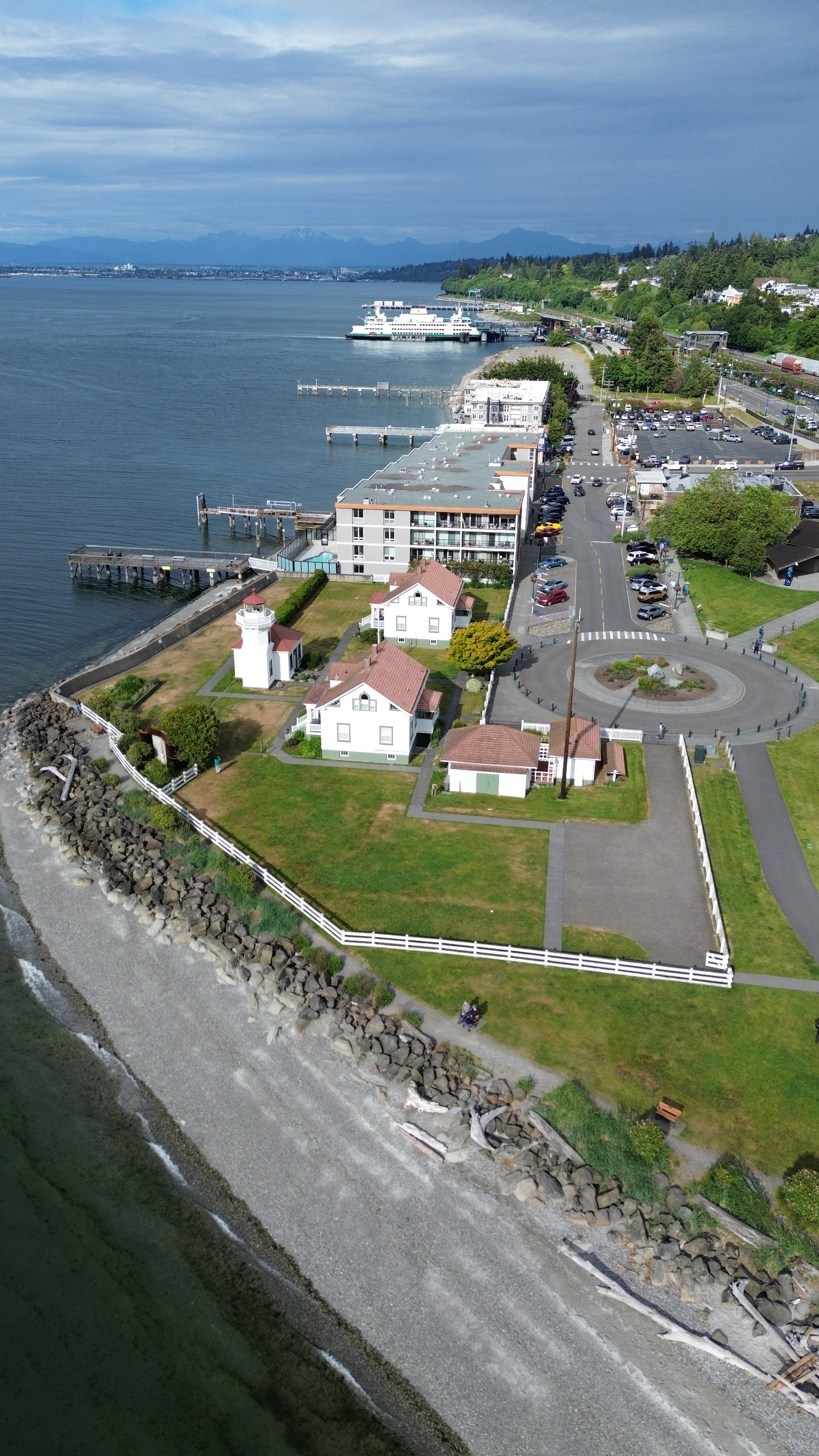
The road leading to Lighthouse Park. This shows the vicinity of the park, the restaurants, the roundabout, and the ferry dock.

Mukilteo Lighthouse Park encompasses the lighthouse at the west end of the city of Mukilteo, Washington, and 12 acres (0.049 km^{2}) south of it. The property is west and south of the Washington State Ferries terminal with ferry service to Clinton, Whidbey Island, and is bordered on the south and east by the BNSF Railway (formerly the Burlington Northern Railroad and Great Northern Railway (U.S.)) mainline. Whidbey Island lies across a narrow portion of Possession Sound and is easily visible from the shore.

This park was formerly known as Mukilteo State Park. The lighthouse was deeded to the City of Mukilteo in 2001, and Washington State Parks deeded the parklands to the City in 2003.

In 2004, the City adopted a Lighthouse Park Master Plan to make physical site improvements in four phases. Phases I and II have been completed, adding amenities and parking.

The artwork by Joe Gobin and James Madison, Tulalip Tribal carvers, indicates the significance of this site to many tribes, especially the Tulalip Tribes of Snohomish County, who lived at this location for over 1,000 years until European-American occupation in the mid-nineteenth century. The 1855 Point Elliott Treaty was signed in the area and three tribes were forced to re-settle at Tulalip Bay across Port Gardner Bay.

Lighthouse Park is also significant as Captain George Vancouver's naturalist landed a small craft on the shoreline on May 31, 1792. Vancouver named the area Rose Point, a name today reflected in that of the nearby community of Rosehill.

Mukilteo Lighthouse Park has about 1,500 feet (460 m) of sandy beach and includes a public boat launch, a lighthouse and a shoreline walkway. It is one of the most easily accessed shorelines in urban Snohomish County, especially for those needing ADA access.

== Amenities ==
- Volleyball net
- Playground
- Picnic tables
- Fire pits
- Outlets
- Restrooms
- Lighthouse
