= Mukilteo Light =

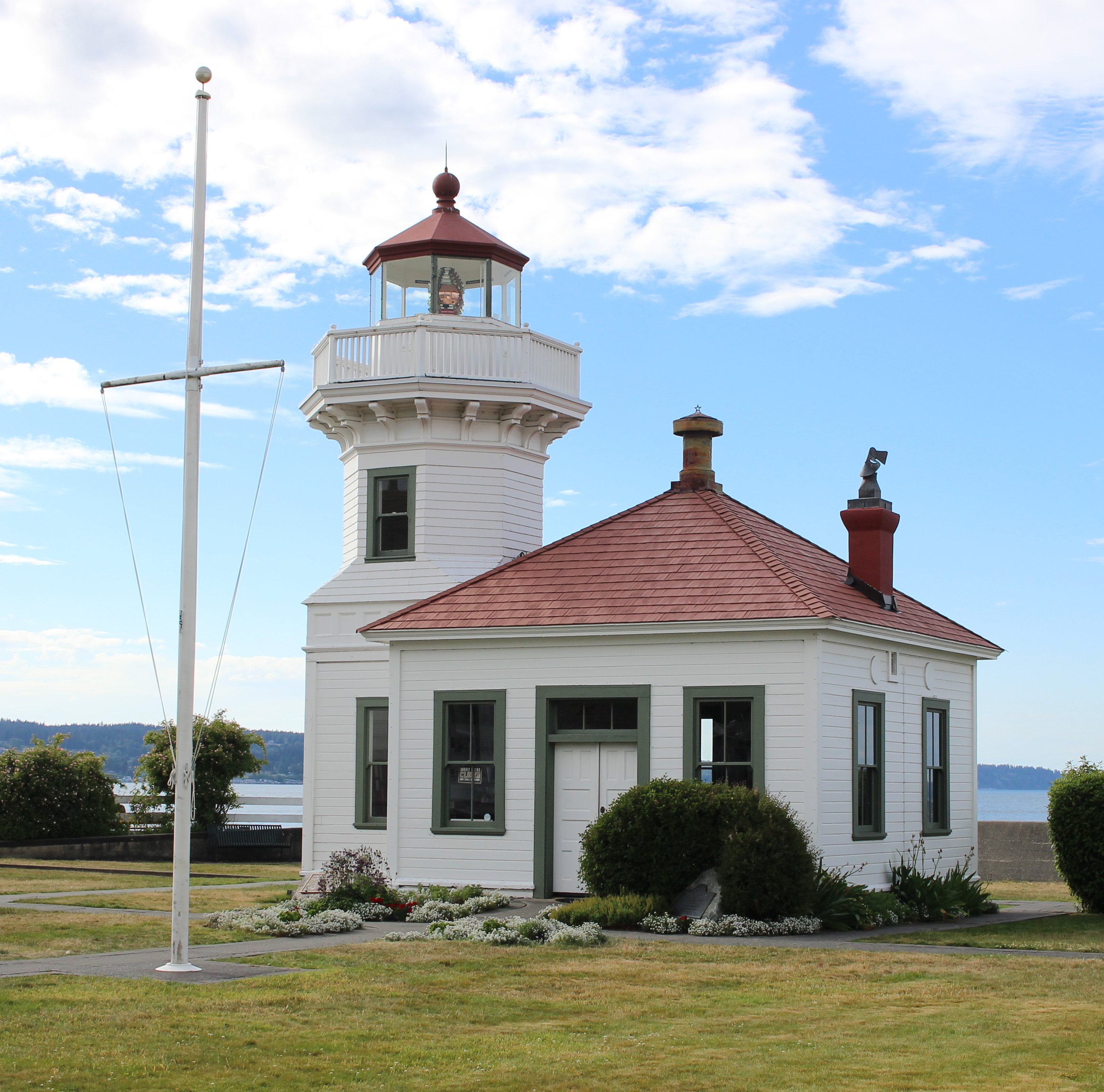
- Location: Mukilteo, Washington
- Coordinates: 47°56′55″N 122°18′16″W

Tower
- Constructed: 1905-06
- Foundation: Surface
- Construction: Wood
- Automated: 1979
- Height: 38 feet (12 m)
- Shape: Octagonal
- Heritage: National Register of Historic Places listed place

Light
- First lit: 1906
- Focal height: 33 feet (10 m)
- Lens: Fourth order Fresnel lens
- Characteristic: White flash every 5 s
- Mukilteo Light Station
- U.S. National Register of Historic Places
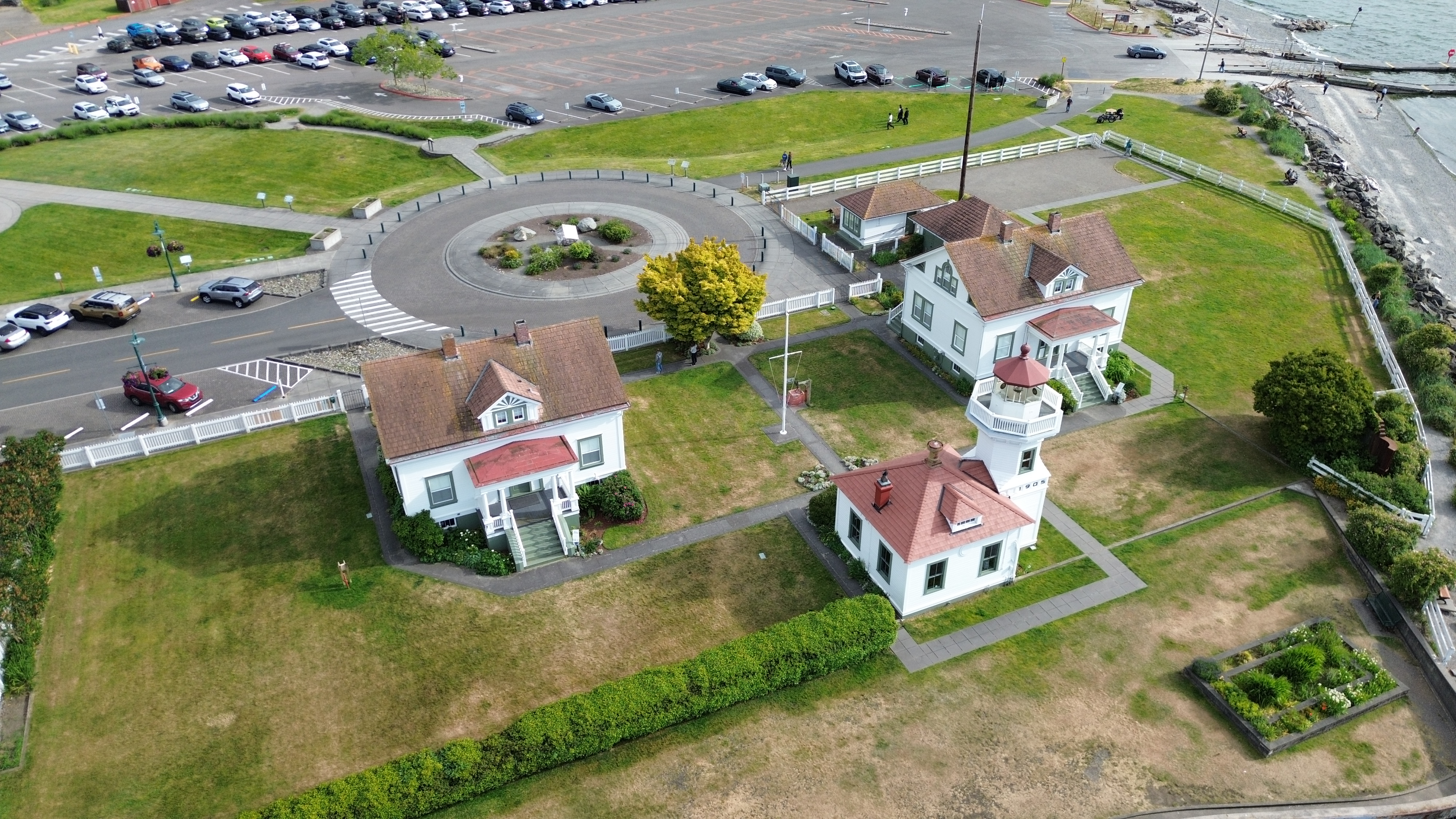
- Nearest city: Mukilteo, Washington
- Built: 1906
- Architect: Leick, Carl W.
- Architectural style: Late 19th and 20th century Revivals: Colonial Revival/Classical Revival
- NRHP reference No.: 77001360
- Added to NRHP: October 21, 1977

The Mukilteo Light is an operational navigation aid located on the east side of Possession Sound at Mukilteo, Snohomish County, Washington, in the United States. It is owned and operated by the City of Mukilteo as part of Mukilteo Lighthouse Park. The lighthouse is listed on the Washington State Heritage Register and was placed on the National Register of Historic Places in 1977.

== History ==
Construction of the lighthouse began in 1905, using the Carl Leick design also seen in the second Ediz Hook lighthouse and Oregon's Cape Arago lighthouse. It was built of wood, while most other lighthouses of the era were constructed using brick and concrete. The lighthouse became operational in 1906, using a revolving Fresnel lens that was manufactured in France in 1852. In 1927, the original lens was replaced with the fixed (non-rotating) fourth-order Fresnel lens which is still in use. The lighthouse and a modern fog signal were automated in 1979, and in 1981, a remote fog sensor was installed.

The two Victorian-style homes on the property were used by Coast Guard personnel until 1996. The entire complex was renovated by the Mukilteo city government in the 1990s for use as a museum.

On August 19, 2001, the U.S. Coast Guard turned over ownership of the lighthouse to the City of Mukilteo. It is the centerpiece of Mukilteo Lighthouse Park, with the grounds and interior open to the public. The Mukilteo Historical Society maintains the lighthouse and its associated museum exhibits.
