= Karman Holdings =

American space and defense company

Karman Holdings Inc.
- Formerly: TCFIII Spaceco Holdings LLC; Karman LLC
- Type: Public
- Traded as: NYSE: KRMN; S&P 600 component
- Industry: Aerospace; Arms industry
- Headquarters: Huntington Beach, California, United States
- Products: "Design, development and production of critical, next-generation system solutions for launch vehicle, satellite, spacecraft, missile defense, hypersonic and UAS customers"
- Revenue: ▲US$472 million (2025)
- Net income: ▲US$17.4 million (2025)
- Subsidiaries: Aerospace Engineering, LLC; AMRO Fabricating Corporation; American Automated Engineering, Inc.; Systima Technologies, Inc.; Rapid Machine Solutions – Wolcott Design Services, LLC
- Website: karman-sd.com

Karman Holdings is an American fabricator of space and defense systems based in Huntington Beach, California. The company was valued at approximately US$4 billion during its initial public offering in February 2025.

The company, whose predecessors have been in business for over 40 years, has grown partly through acquisitions. At the time of the IPO, the largest, and controlling, shareholder was Trive Capital. For the 12 months ending on September 30, 2024, the company had $331 million in revenue. Karman acquired Systima Technologies, an aerospace manufacturer in Mukilteo, Washington, in 2021.
