= Granite Falls, Washington =

Granite Falls
- City
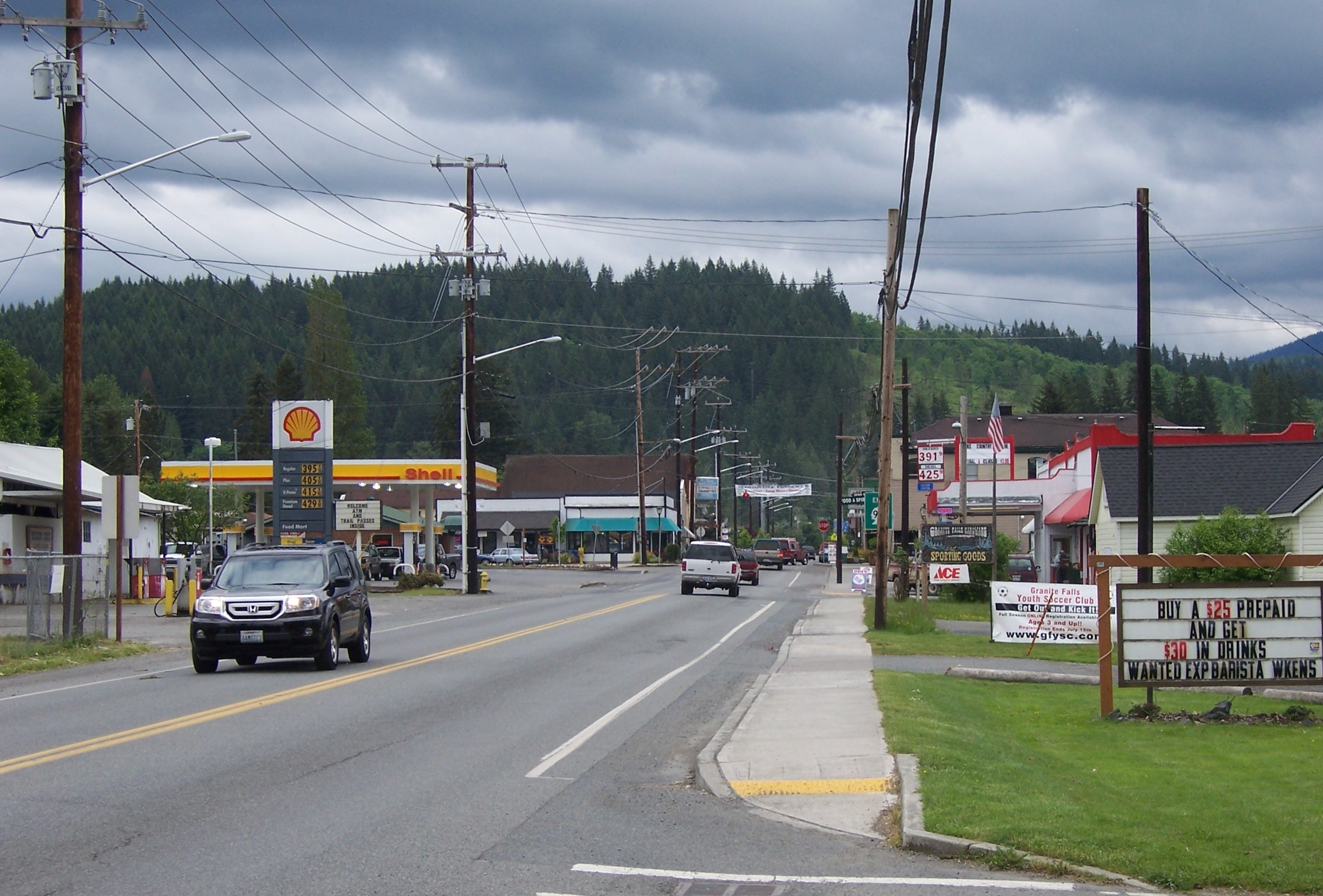
- Stanley Street (SR 92) in downtown Granite Falls

- Flag
- Interactive map of Granite Falls
- Coordinates: 48°4′58″N 121°58′11″W
- Country: United States
- State: Washington
- County: Snohomish

Government
  - Type: Council–manager
  - Manager: Jeff Balentine

Area
  - Total: 2.21 sq mi (5.72 km^{2})
  - Land: 2.19 sq mi (5.68 km^{2})
  - Water: 0.019 sq mi (0.05 km^{2})
- Elevation: 407 ft (124 m)

Population (2020)
  - Total: 4,450
  - Estimate (2022): 4,835
  - Density: 2,014.9/sq mi (777.97/km^{2})
- Time zone: UTC-8 (Pacific (PST))
  - Summer (DST): UTC-7 (PDT)
- ZIP Code: 98252
- Area code: 360, 564
- FIPS code: 53-27995
- GNIS feature ID: 1520218
- Website: granitefallswa.gov

Granite Falls is a city in Snohomish County, Washington, United States. It is located between the Pilchuck and Stillaguamish rivers in the western foothills of the Cascade Range, northeast of Lake Stevens and Marysville. The city is named for a waterfall north of downtown on the Stillaguamish River, also accessible via the Mountain Loop Highway. As of the 2020 census, Granite Falls had a population of 4,450.

The site of Granite Falls was originally a portage for local Coast Salish tribes prior to the arrival of American settlers. The settlement was founded in 1883 and prospered after the discovery of gold and silver in the Monte Cristo mines located east of Granite Falls on the Everett and Monte Cristo Railway. Granite Falls was platted in 1891 and incorporated as a fourth-class town on November 8, 1903.

== History ==
The Pilchuck River and Upper Stillaguamish basin was historically inhabited by the Skykomish people, who used the modern-day site of Granite Falls as a portage along with other Coast Salish tribes. Several Skykomish archaeological sites were discovered in the 1970s between modern-day Granite Falls and Lochsloy, with over 700 artifacts recovered from later excavation.

The first permanent European settler was Joseph Sous Enas from the Azores, who staked a homestead claim in 1883 on land south of the present city. He was joined by other homesteaders who took advantage of open land that had been cleared by an earlier wildfire, nicknamed "the Big Burn". A school district was established in 1886, initially using an abandoned cabin as a one-room schoolhouse until a permanent school was built in 1893. The discovery of gold and silver in the Cascades, particularly around Monte Cristo, lured miners and settlers to the Granite Falls area.

A general store and post office were established in 1890 at the corner of four homesteads, which would later form the center of the townsite platted in August 1891. The name "Granite Falls" was chosen for the settlement to replace the earlier name of "Portage". The Everett and Monte Cristo Railway reached Granite Falls on October 16, 1892, building a station for the town on the route between Monte Cristo and the county seat of Everett.

On November 8, 1903, Granite Falls voted to become a city. It was officially incorporated as a fourth-class city on December 21, 1903. At the time, it had approximately 600 residents and several lumber mills. Electricity, sewers, sidewalks, telephones, cars, and all the amenities of modern life soon followed. A power plant was also constructed at the falls.

By World War I, the once bustling mining towns of Monte Cristo and Silverton were no longer shipping out ore. The railroad, now owned by Northern Pacific, stopped running and the tracks were torn out in the early 1930s to make way for the Mountain Loop Highway.

Granite Falls between the world wars was a lumber town; logging companies felled trees, sawmills created lumber and shingle mills created shingles. The Great Depression, however, took its toll. By 1935, the population of Granite Falls was half what it was in 1925. Mills closed and people left to find work elsewhere. On April 26, 1933, a fire destroyed the Cascade Hotel in downtown Granite Falls and threatened other buildings. The historic hotel was rebuilt at the same site.

At the end of World War II, things looked bleak. The opening of Miller Shingle in 1946 (now the country's largest specialty lumber mill) meant jobs both in the woods and at the mill. Construction booms through Snohomish and King counties also meant jobs at the gravel pits dotted around Granite Falls. The city later became a bedroom community for commuters working in Everett and Lake Stevens for large companies.

Hard times would come again. In 1986, the United States Forest Service severely limited logging in old-growth forests under its protection in an effort to save the northern spotted owl from extinction. In June, 1990, the U.S. Fish and Wildlife Department declared the spotted owl an endangered species, and in 1991, a federal court judge ruled the Forest Service's logging plan to save the owl was inadequate. Over one-fourth of old-growth forest on both public and private land were put off-limits to logging.

In the 21st century, Granite Falls has focused on attracting visitors to the natural environment and recreational opportunities along the Mt. Loop Highway. Expanded housing development has brought an increased population of families who commute to Everett, Seattle, and the Eastside to work. In 2001, the Tsubaki Grand Shrine of America was given a 17-acre (7 ha) plot of land next to Kannagara Jinja (built by the Reverend of the shrine) in Granite Falls, which was built upon, combining the two places.

A truck bypass around the north side of downtown Granite Falls opened in 2010 to serve several quarries to the northeast. A new high school campus was built near the bypass, along with a housing development with 327 homes in the late 2010s.

A downtown revitalization project began in the 2000s with renovations to buildings and a small city park. A new civic center is planned along South Granite Avenue, including a city hall that opened in 2019, a public plaza, a community center, and a gymnasium for the Boys & Girls Club that will also serve as an emergency shelter. The city government has also proposed promoting Granite Falls as a location for outdoor recreation retailers and businesses.

== Geography ==
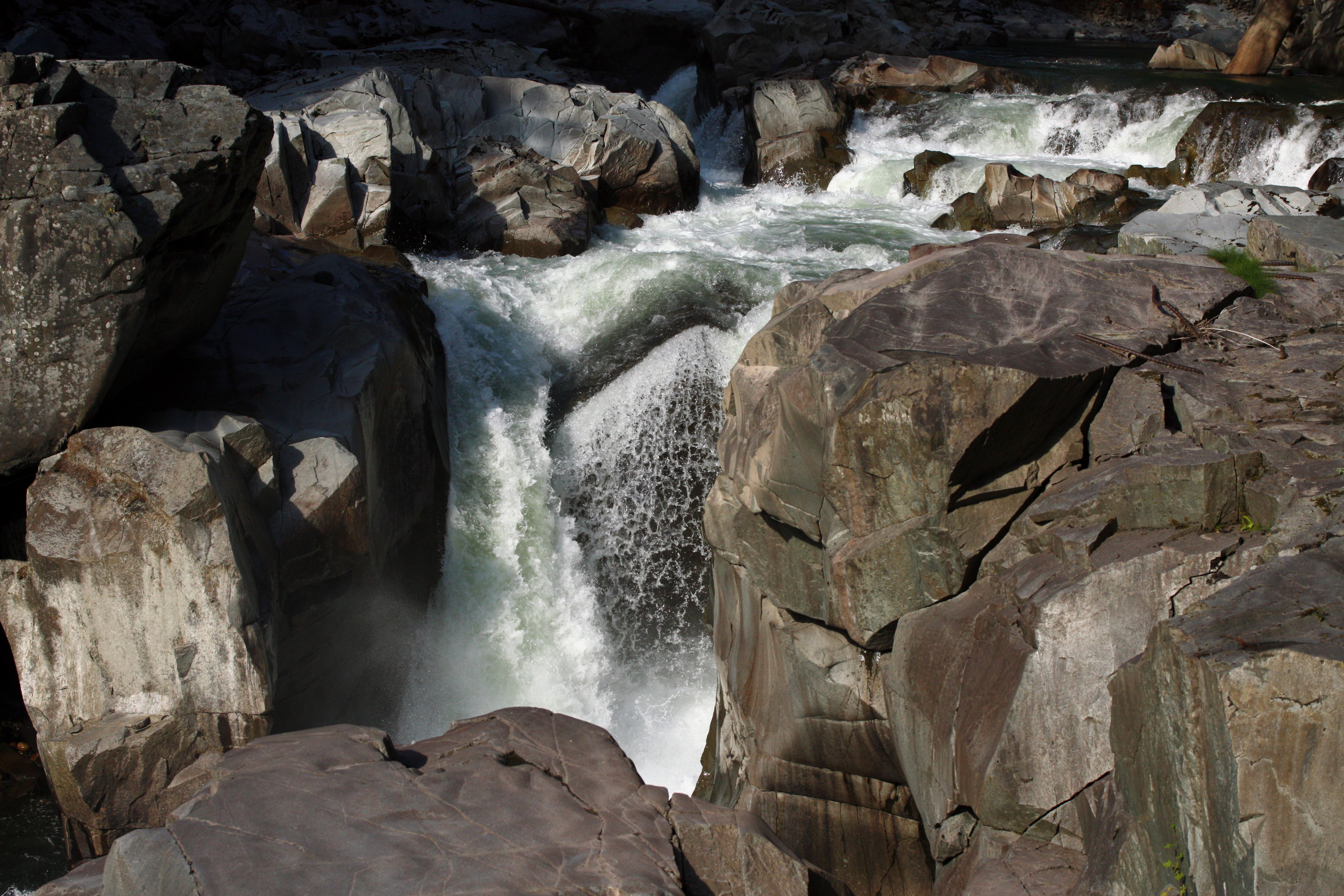
The eponymous waterfall on the South Fork Stillaguamish River

Granite Falls is located in Snohomish County, approximately 17 miles (27 km) east of Everett, the county seat, and 45 miles (72 km) northeast of Seattle. It lies on a plateau in the western foothills of the Cascade Range between the South Fork Stillaguamish River to the north and the Pilchuck River to the south. Granite Falls is also the southern entrance to the Mountain Loop Highway, a scenic highway that continues into the Cascades to Darrington.

The city limits are defined to the north by the Stillaguamish River, to the east by Iron Mountain, to the south by the Pilchuck River, and to the west by 174th Avenue Northeast. According to the United States Census Bureau, the city has a total area of 2.20 square miles (5.70 km^{2}), of which, 2.18 square miles (5.65 km^{2}) is land and 0.02 square miles (0.05 km^{2}) is water.

It is situated where the South Fork of the Stillaguamish River leaves its narrow mountain valley, which includes the namesake Granite Falls. The falls has a 540-foot (160 m) fishway and a 280-foot (85 m) tunnel that were built in 1954, at the time the longest fish tunnel in the world. The area where the city was founded was called the "portage" by native tribes in the area, who used the flat area between the two rivers to portage their canoes when traveling. Iron Mountain, which sits at 1,240 feet (380 m) above sea level, lies east of downtown and is home to a quarry. The Rogers Belt, a series of local faults, runs northwest from Granite Falls towards Mount Vernon.

=== Climate ===
The climate in this area has mild differences between highs and lows, and most of the rainfall occurs between October and May. Temperatures in the summer can be up to 10 degrees warmer than nearby Everett, due to its slightly inland location. According to the Köppen Climate Classification system, Granite Falls has a marine west coast climate, abbreviated "Cfb" on climate maps.

== Economy ==
As of 2018, Granite Falls has an estimated workforce population of 1,816 people, of which 1,746 are employed. The largest sectors of employment are educational and health services (21.6 percent), followed by construction (17.0%), manufacturing (16.6%), and retail (10.7%). The majority of workers in the city commute to other areas for employment, including 19 percent to Everett, 11 percent to Seattle, and 5 percent to Marysville. Approximately 5.2 percent of Granite Falls residents work within the city limits. Over 80 percent of workers commute in single-occupant vehicles, while 4 percent take public transportation or carpools.

The city had 202 registered businesses with 849 total jobs, according to 2012 estimates by the U.S. Census and Puget Sound Regional Council. The largest providers of jobs in Granite Falls came from businesses in the education and services sectors. Several of the largest employers are located in an industrial park in the northeast corner of the city near the Mountain Loop Highway. They include electrical manufacturer B.I.C. and aerospace manufacturer Cobalt Industries. Granite Falls is located near several rock and gravel quarries, which created traffic congestion in downtown that was later mitigated through the opening of a truck bypass in 2010.

== Demographics ==
Historical population
Census	Pop.	Note	%±
1910	714		—
1920	632		−11.5%
1930	495		−21.7%
1940	683		38.0%
1950	635		−7.0%
1960	599		−5.7%
1970	813		35.7%
1980	911		12.1%
1990	1,060		16.4%
2000	2,347		121.4%
2010	3,364		43.3%
2020	4,450		32.3%
2022 (est.)	4,234		−4.9%
U.S. Decennial Census

The population was 3,364 at the 2020 census. The city's population grew rapidly in the 1990s and 2000s due to new development and annexations.

The town has had an ongoing drug crisis due to the presence of meth and opioids, which earned national coverage in the early 2000s.

=== 2020 census ===
As of the 2020 census, there were 4,450 people and 1,530 households living in Granite Falls, which had a population density of 93.8 inhabitants per square mile (36.2/km^{2}). There were 1,594 total housing units, of which 96.0% were occupied and 4.0% were vacant or for occasional use. The racial makeup of the city was 80.3% White, 1.3% Native American and Alaskan Native, 1.3% Black or African American, 2.6% Asian, and 0.2% Native Hawaiian and Pacific Islander. Residents who listed another race were 4.2% of the population and those who identified as more than one race were 10.2% of the population. Hispanic or Latino residents of any race were 9.1% of the population.

Of the 1,530 households in Granite Falls, 53.3% were married couples living together and 9.7% were cohabitating but unmarried. Households with a male householder with no spouse or partner were 16.4% of the population, while households with a female householder with no spouse or partner were 20.6% of the population. Out of all households, 41.1% had children under the age of 18 living with them and 24.2% had residents who were 65 years of age or older. There were 1,530 occupied housing units in Granite Falls, of which 69.3% were owner-occupied and 30.7% were occupied by renters.

The median age in the city was 33.6 years old for all sexes, 33.1 years old for males, and 34.2 years old for females. Of the total population, 29.0% of residents were under the age of 19; 31.3% were between the ages of 20 and 39; 29.0% were between the ages of 40 and 64; and 10.9% were 65 years of age or older. The gender makeup of the city was 50.1% male and 49.9% female.

=== 2010 census ===
As of the 2010 census, there were 3,364 people, 1,222 households, and 831 families residing in the city. The population density was 1,543.1 inhabitants per square mile (595.8/km^{2}). There were 1,344 housing units at an average density of 616.5 per square mile (238.0/km^{2}). The racial makeup of the city was 87.6% White, 0.7% African American, 1.2% Native American, 1.5% Asian, 0.3% Pacific Islander, 3.2% from other races, and 5.5% from two or more races. Hispanic or Latino of any race were 7.5% of the population.

There were 1,222 households, of which 42.5% had children under the age of 18 living with them, 49.5% were married couples living together, 12.5% had a female householder with no husband present, 6.0% had a male householder with no wife present, and 32.0% were non-families. 25.6% of all households were made up of individuals, and 10.3% had someone living alone who was 65 years of age or older. The average household size was 2.75 and the average family size was 3.33.

The median age in the city was 34.4 years. 29.4% of residents were under the age of 18; 8.4% were between the ages of 18 and 24; 30.9% were from 25 to 44; 23.1% were from 45 to 64; and 8.4% were 65 years of age or older. The gender makeup of the city was 50.2% male and 49.8% female.

== Government and politics ==
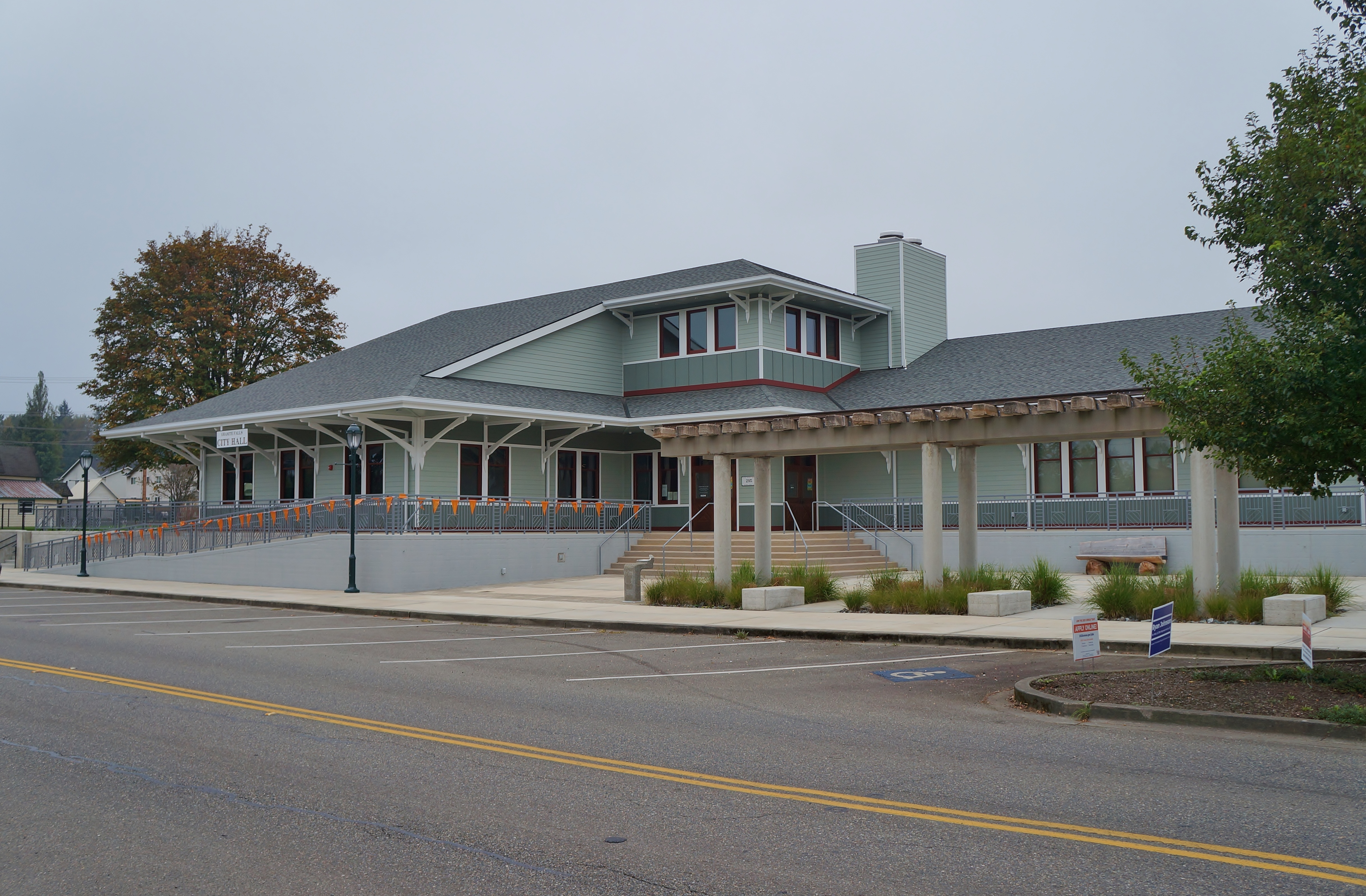
The city hall of Granite Falls, opened in 2019

Granite Falls is a non-charter code city with a council–manager system of government. The five members of the city council are elected at-large to four-year terms in staggered odd years. The city council serves as the city's legislative body and selects a ceremonial mayor from its members to manage meetings. The daily operations of the city government are overseen by the city manager, who is appointed by the city council. Granite Falls switched from a "strong" mayor–council government in 2015 and hired former city administrator and public works director Brent Kirk as its first city manager. As of 2025, the city manager is Jeff Balentine.

The city government had nine full-time employees and an annual budget of $5.2 million in 2017. Municipal services include public safety, utilities, street maintenance, and managing parks and recreational activities. Granite Falls has contracted with the Snohomish County Sheriff's Office to provide policing services for the area since 2014, when the city's police department was disbanded. Firefighting services are provided by Snohomish County Fire District 17, which covers 38 square miles (98 km^{2}) of Granite Falls and surrounding unincorporated areas. The Granite Falls city hall is located on South Granite Avenue in downtown at a 7,600-square-foot (710 m^{2}) building that opened in August 2019. It cost $3.9 million to construct, using loans and reserve funds, and replaced a smaller building across the street that had accessibility issues.

At the federal level, Granite Falls is part of the 8th congressional district, which encompasses the eastern portions of the Snohomish, King, and Pierce counties as well as the entirety of Chelan and Kittitas counties. The city was part of the 1st congressional district until 2022. At the state level, Granite Falls shares the 39th legislative district with Lake Stevens, Darrington, and eastern Skagit County. The city lies in the Snohomish County Council's 1st district, which includes most of the county north of Everett and Lake Stevens.

== Culture ==
Granite Falls has several annual community events, the largest of which is Railroad Days in early October. The Railroad Days festival was established in 1965 by a schoolteacher and celebrates the city's local history. It attracts about 5,000 visitors and includes a parade, a street fair, carnival rides, and tours.

The city's historical society opened its museum in October 2007 at a two-story building with 30,000 square feet (2,800 m^{2}) of space. The museum launched a digitization project in 2016, using volunteer labor to preserve photographs and newspaper records.

=== Arts ===
The Granite Falls area has been home to several renowned artists, including Kenneth Callahan and Guy Anderson in the 1940s and 1950s. The city has several works of public art, including downtown murals and sculptures at local schools. Among them is a 12-foot (3.7 m) wood carving of Bigfoot created by a local cryptozoologist. In 2000, Granite Falls erected several sculptures depicting toilets to raise funds for a public restroom as part of the annual Art in the Parks festival.

The 1977 movie Joyride, set in Alaska, and the 2018 movie Outside In were partially filmed in Granite Falls. A local music venue at the Scherrer Ranch was closed in 1995 by the county government after it constructed a stage without permits.

=== Parks and recreation ===
Granite Falls is located near recreational areas along the Mountain Loop Highway in the Mount Baker–Snoqualmie National Forest, including sites for hiking, camping, and fishing. Among the major attractions on the Mountain Loop Highway are the ghost town of Monte Cristo and the Big Four Ice Caves. Other major recreational areas near Granite Falls include Lake Bosworth and Lake Roesiger to the south, which are both stocked by the Washington Department of Fish and Wildlife.

The city government owns eight parks and nature preserves, ranging from small neighborhood parks to city recreational areas. The largest is Frank Mason Park, which encompasses the 10-acre (4.0 ha) Lake Gardner and 32.4 acres (13.1 ha) of surrounding land that has been partially developed. The park has a fishing pier, restrooms, picnic tables, and walking paths. The city and local school district maintain several athletic facilities for residents, as well as a skate park and dog park.

=== Media ===
The first newspaper in Granite Falls, the Post, began publishing on July 23, 1903. It was later replaced by the Record in 1922 and the Press, which later merged with a newspaper in Lake Stevens. Granite Falls is also served by two regional daily newspapers: The Everett Herald and The Seattle Times.

The first public library in Granite Falls was established in 1921 and had shared space with other city and community facilities for its entire existence as an independent system. The city's voters approved annexation into the regional Sno-Isle Libraries system in 1995 along with a $1.6 million bond issue to finance the construction of a separate library building; at the time, the library had 1,800 square feet (170 m^{2}) of space within the Granite Falls community center. The financing mechanism, a new kind of special district created by the state legislature, was contested by a lawsuit but upheld by the Washington Supreme Court in April 1998. A 1.5-acre (0.61 ha) parcel was donated by a local resident for use as a library or other educational facility and officially approved for the new library in June 1999. The Granite Falls branch of the Sno-Isle Libraries system opened on May 29, 2001. The library has 6,500 square feet (600 m^{2}) of space and originally held 36,000 total materials when it opened; it is located east of downtown Granite Falls and was initially owned by the city government until it was transferred to Sno-Isle in 2012.

=== Religion ===
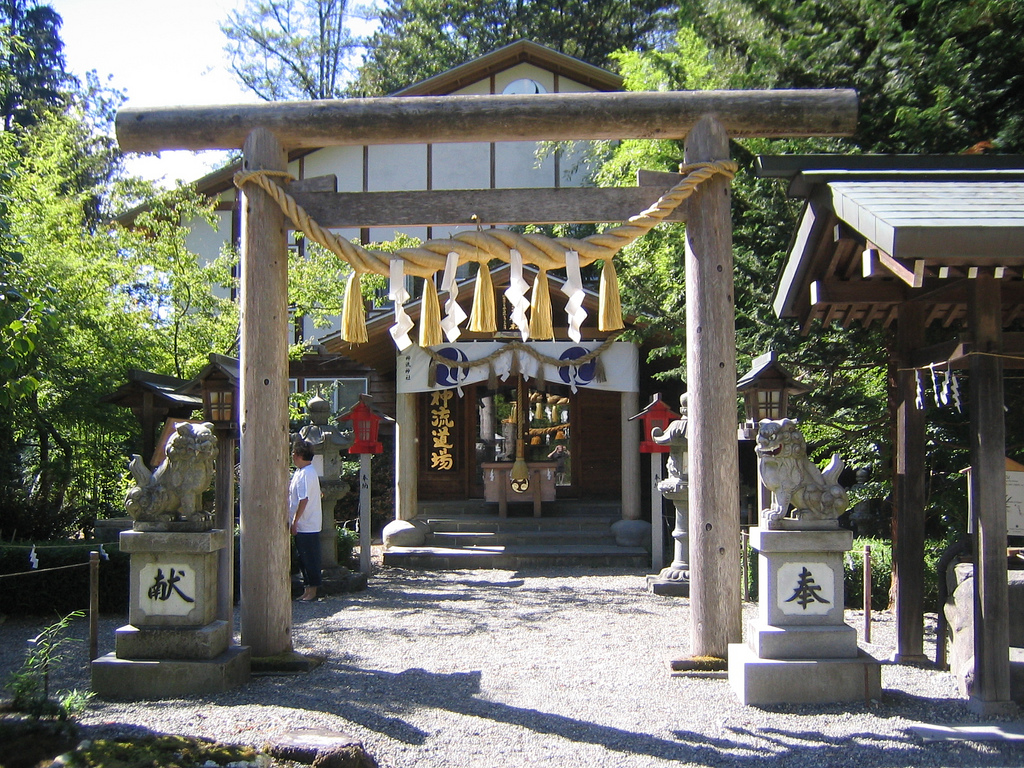
The Tsubaki Grand Shrine of America was active from 2001 to 2023

The Tsubaki Grand Shrine of America was located west of Granite Falls on 25 acres (10 ha) overlooking the Pilchuck River. The Shinto shrine was one of a few in the United States and was dedicated in 2001 after moving from Stockton, California. The Tsubaki Grand Shrine was open to the public and hosted several annual festivals and religious ceremonies, as well as aikido lessons. The shrine's head priest was Lawrence Koichi Barrish, among the first non-Japanese people to be ordained as a priest; he retired in 2023 and the shrine was closed.

The Holy Cross Catholic Church in downtown Granite Falls was built in 1903 and served as a satellite parish of St. Michael's Catholic Church until 2004. The church's congregation was split between Granite Falls and Lake Stevens until a new church was constructed in 2008. The old building was renovated for a bilingual Christian church that opened in 2015. The LDS Church established a local ward in the 1990s and opened a dedicated chapel adjacent to Granite Falls High School in 2009. Other religious institutions in the area include a Khmer Buddhist temple and an Evangelical Christian church.

=== Notable residents ===
- Kenneth Callahan, painter and muralist
- Willo Davis Roberts, author
- Mike Squires, musician and songwriter
- Robert Sutherland, state representative

== Education ==
The city has four public schools that are operated by the Granite Falls School District, which also serves unincorporated communities to the northwest and near the Mountain Loop Highway. The school district had an enrollment of over 2,100 students in 2018 and employed 107 teachers and 80 other staff members. Granite Falls has two elementary schools (Mountain Way and Monte Cristo), Granite Falls Middle School, Granite Falls High School, and Crossroads High School, an alternative school program. Andrea Peterson of Monte Cristo Elementary School was named the 2007 National Teacher of the Year.

The first schoolhouse in Granite Falls opened in 1893 and was replaced by a new building at the site in 1910. A larger building opened in 1938 for Granite Falls High School, which later moved to a nearby building in 1964 and opened at its new campus in January 2008. The high school's athletic teams, nicknamed the Tigers, compete in the North Sound Conference; a 1,700-seat football stadium opened at the new high school campus in 2018, replacing the Hi-Jewel Stadium at the former high school, which had been converted into a middle school.

== Infrastructure ==
=== Transportation ===
Granite Falls is the terminus of State Route 92, which connects the area to State Route 9 in Lake Stevens. A 1.9-mile (3.1 km) bypass for freight traffic was completed around the north side of the city in 2010 at a cost of $28.8 million. The Mountain Loop Highway, a scenic byway, begins in Granite Falls and travels east into the Cascade Mountains before turning north to reach Darrington. It is used by an estimated 55,000 tourists annually and provides access to recreational areas in the Mount Baker–Snoqualmie National Forest.

Community Transit, the countywide public transportation provider, has bus and paratransit service that reaches Granite Falls. A bus route connects the city to Lake Stevens and Everett Station. The nearest airport with commercial service is Paine Field in Everett.

=== Utilities ===
Electric power in Granite Falls is supplied by the Snohomish County Public Utility District (PUD), a consumer-owned public utility that serves all of Snohomish County. The city government purchases its tap water from the PUD, which is sourced from the City of Everett system at Spada Lake and Lake Chaplain. Since 2012, the PUD has also supplied water to Granite Falls that is sourced from groundwater wells near Lake Stevens and treated to be similar to the water from the City of Everett system. The city government also manages a sanitary sewage system that terminates at a treatment plant that discharges water into the Pilchuck River. The treatment plant was replaced in 2026 by a new facility that would be able to handle a larger number of customers.

Natural gas service for the city is provided by Puget Sound Energy, a regional gas utility company. The city government contracts with Waste Management to provide curbside collection and disposal of garbage, recycling, and yard waste. The Granite Falls area also has two recycling and disposal centers operated by Snohomish County. Telecommunications services are provided by Verizon and Comcast.

=== Healthcare ===
The nearest general hospitals to Granite Falls are Providence Medical Center in Everett and Cascade Valley Hospital in Arlington. The city's sole medical clinic was part of the Cascade Valley system, which was absorbed into Skagit Regional Health in 2016.
