= Pilchuck River =

Tributary of the Snohomish River, northwest Washington, United States

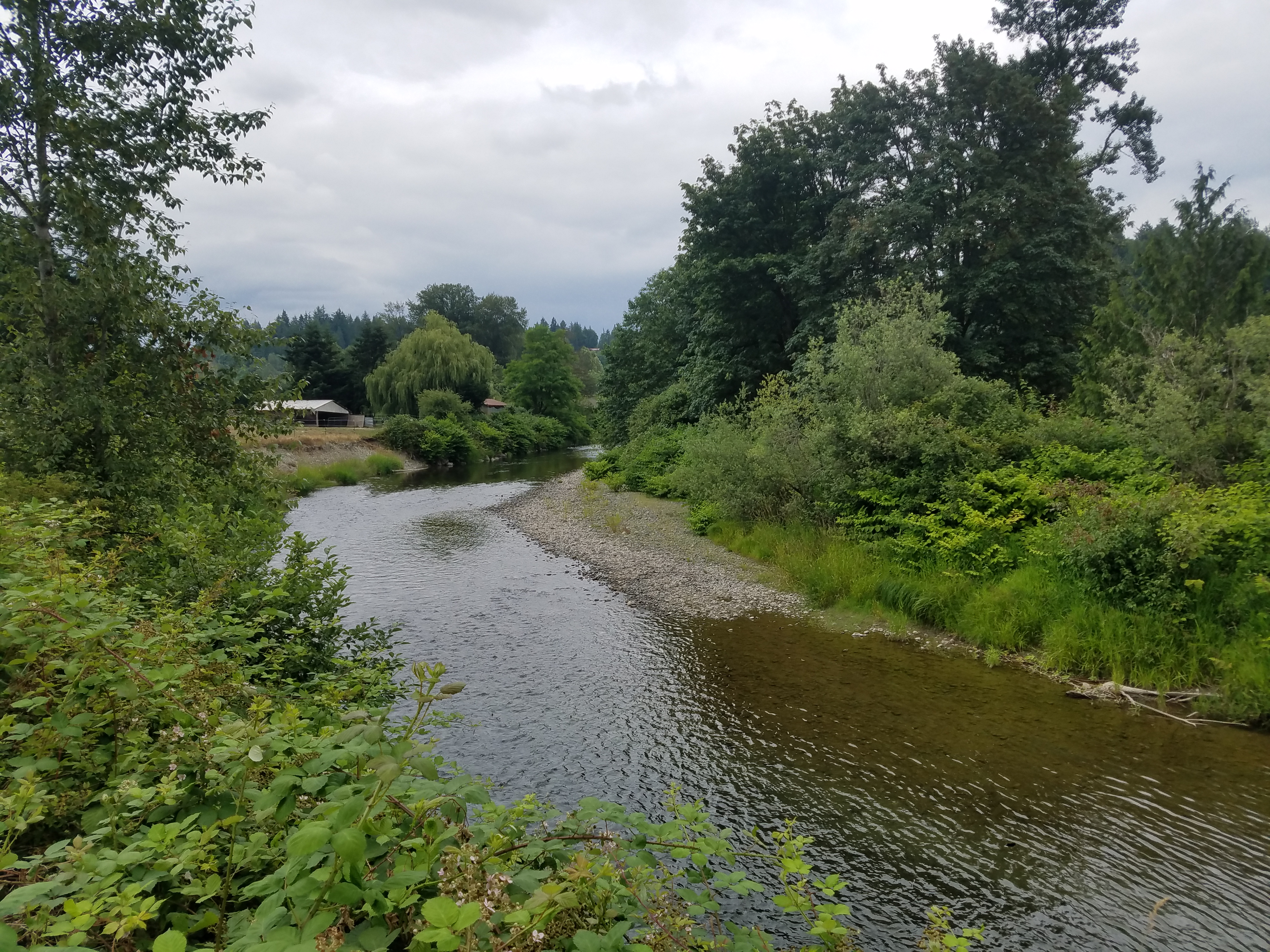
- Pilchuck River a few miles north of Snohomish

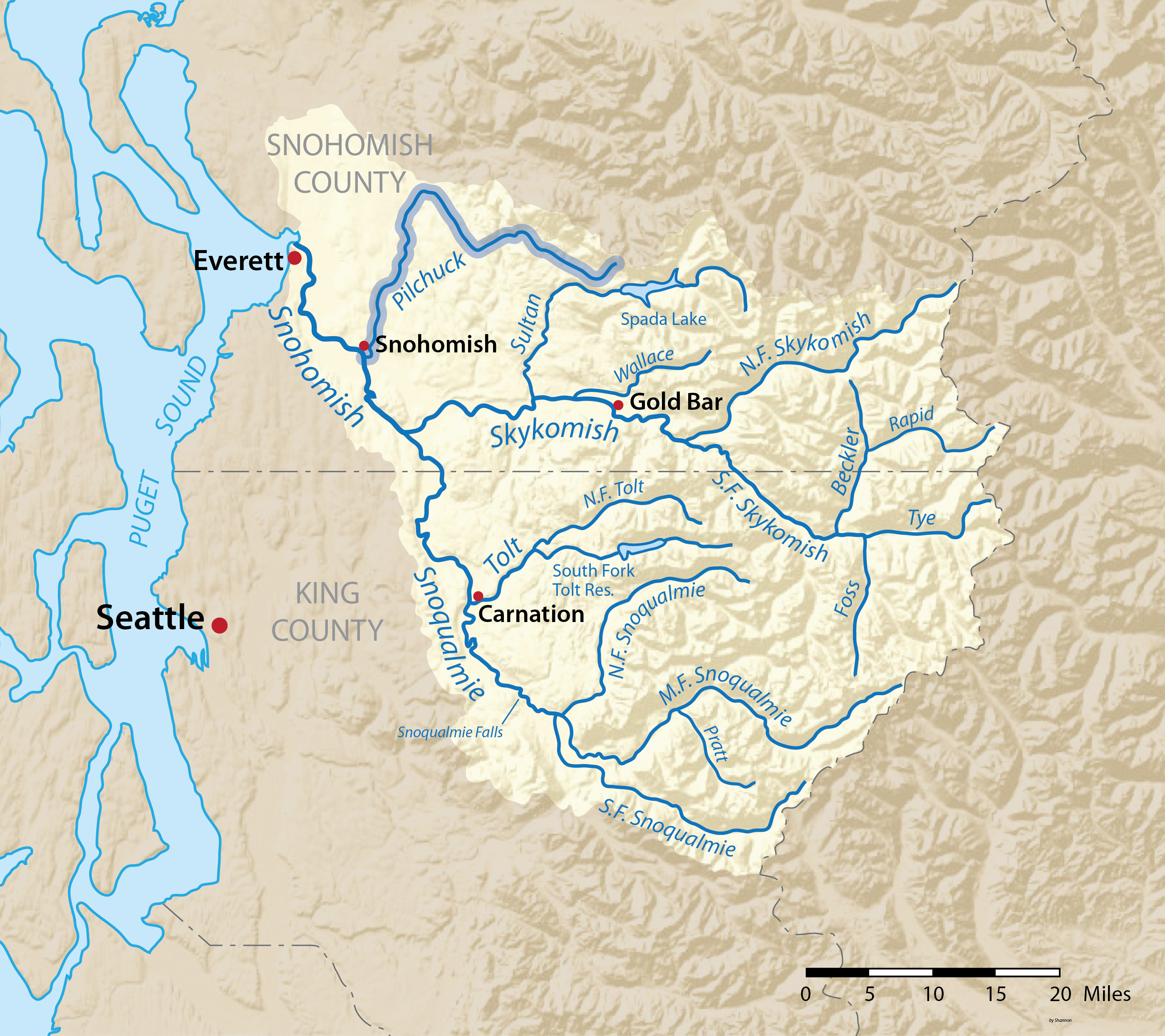
- Map of the Pilchuck River highlighted in the Snohomish River watershed
- Native name: dxʷkʷiƛ̕əb (Lushootseed)

Location
- Country: United States
- State: Washington
- Region: Snohomish County
- Cities: Snohomish, Granite Falls

Physical characteristics
- Source: Cascade Range
  - coordinates: 47°59′19″N 121°40′43″W
  - elevation: 2,125 ft (648 m)
- Mouth: Snohomish River
  - coordinates: 47°54′13″N 122°5′27″W
  - elevation: 8 ft (2.4 m)
- Length: 40 mi (64 km)
- Basin size: 127 sq mi (330 km^{2})
- Discharge
  - average: 467 cu ft/s (13.2 m^{3}/s)
  - minimum: 36 cu ft/s (1.0 m^{3}/s)
  - maximum: 5,050 cu ft/s (143 m^{3}/s)

The Pilchuck River (Lushootseed: dxʷkʷiƛ̕əb) is a river in Snohomish County in the U.S. state of Washington. It is a tributary of the Snohomish River. The name is derived from the Chinook Jargon pilpil ("blood", "red") and chuck ("water"), or "red water". The Lushootseed name means "flowing red," kʷiƛ̕ being an archaic term for "red" in Northern Lushootseed.

== Course ==
The Pilchuck River originates in the Cascade Range. It flows generally west until it reaches Granite Falls, then it turns and flows south, passing by Lochsloy and Machias before emptying into the Snohomish River near Snohomish. The Snohomish River empties into Possession Sound, part of Puget Sound. The Pilchuck River has sections that have long stretches of gravel bars as well as glacial terraces. Until about 1 million years ago, the river originated further east (what today is called the upper Sultan River, upstream of the Spada Lake reservoir). At that time, during the last Ice Age, a mile-thick ice sheet blocked the passageway into the Pilchuck river, thus rerouting what now is Sultan River.

The Pilchuck River flows alongside the Centennial Trail from Machias to Snohomish.

== Human history ==
Suburban development along the river's course in the mid-to-late 20th century resulted in declining salmon runs and the placement of obstructions that damaged fish habitats. Mitigation work began in 2002 under the Washington State Department of Transportation (WSDOT); the Pilchuck River had begun to threaten sections of State Route 92 near Granite Falls with erosion. A house was swept away by the river in 2012 and continued to threaten other properties, resulting in a 2016 WSDOT project to stabilize the banks and reroute the river. Additional work to create new fish habitats in the river by placing logs tied to large rocks began in 2024.

The Pilchuck River Dam was constructed in 1912 southeast of Granite Falls to provide drinking water for parts of Snohomish. A second dam on the site was constructed in 1932 and included a fish ladder. The dams prevented salmon from accessing the upper Pilchuck watershed; by 2019, the annual salmon run had declined by 99.6 percent of its historic counts. The Tulalip Tribes and city government of Snohomish planned for the dam's removal in the 2010s and received funding from government sources and a grant from the Paul G. Allen Family Foundation. The dam was removed in August 2020 at a cost of $2 million; by November, most of the sediment behind the dam had been deposited downstream by the river. By 2023, salmon had returned to the upper portions of Pilchuck River.

== See also ==
- List of rivers of Washington (state)
