= Washington State Route 92 =

State highway in Snohomish County, Washington, US

State Route 92
- Granite Falls Highway
- A map of the Lake Stevens area with SR 92 highlighted in red

Route information
- Auxiliary route of SR 9
- Maintained by WSDOT
- Length: 9.16 mi (14.74 km)
- Existed: 1964–present

Major junctions
- West end: SR 9 in Lake Stevens
- East end: Mountain Loop Highway in Granite Falls

Location
- Country: United States
- State: Washington
- County: Snohomish

Highway system
- State highways in Washington; Interstate; US; State; Scenic; Pre-1964; 1964 renumbering; Former
← I-90	→ SR 96

State Route 92 (SR 92) is a short state highway entirely within Snohomish County, Washington, United States. The nine-mile (14.5 km) highway connects SR 9 in Lake Stevens to the Mountain Loop Highway in Granite Falls.

SR 92 follows the general route of the Monte Cristo and Everett Railroad, which was completed in 1894 and later paralleled by a local road. The highway to Granite Falls was transferred to the state government in 1937 and designated as part of Secondary State Highway 15A (SSH 15A), which continued southwesterly to the Hewitt Avenue Trestle. During the 1964 state highway renumbering, SSH 15A was split between SR 204 and SR 92, the latter of which was moved to a new highway bypassing downtown Lake Stevens in the 1960s.

Recently, the Washington State Department of Transportation (WSDOT) has completed small projects to improve SR 92, including two roundabouts within the first two miles of the highway's western terminus and a roundabout/truck bypass of Granite Falls.

== Route description ==
SR 92 begins at a T intersection with SR 9 in northwestern Lake Stevens at its border with Marysville. The highway travels east across the northern outskirts of Lake Stevens and its residential neighborhoods, intersecting Lake Cassidy Road and 113th Avenue with roundabouts. It then crosses over the Centennial Trail, connected by a nearby trailhead, and leaves Lake Stevens. SR 92 continues northeast along Little Pilchuck Creek and the Pilchuck River across the rural Lochsloy prairie. The highway travels into the western outskirts of Granite Falls and turns north at a roundabout with 96th Street, which forms a short spur route along the former alignment of SR 92. The highway continues around the north side of Granite Falls on a truck bypass with roundabouts at Burn Road (near the Granite Falls High School campus) and Jordan Road. SR 92 then shifts southeasterly onto Quarry Road, which it follows to a quarry on the northeast side of the city and its terminus, a junction with the Mountain Loop Highway, which continues east into the Cascade Mountains.

SR 92 is maintained by the Washington State Department of Transportation (WSDOT), which conducts an annual survey on state highways to measure traffic volume in terms of annual average daily traffic. Average traffic volumes on the highway in 2016 ranged from a minimum of 4,100 vehicles at its eastern terminus to a maximum of 18,000 vehicles near its western terminus. SR 92 is also served by Community Transit bus route 280, which connects Lake Stevens and Granite Falls to Everett Station and the Boeing Everett Factory.

== History ==
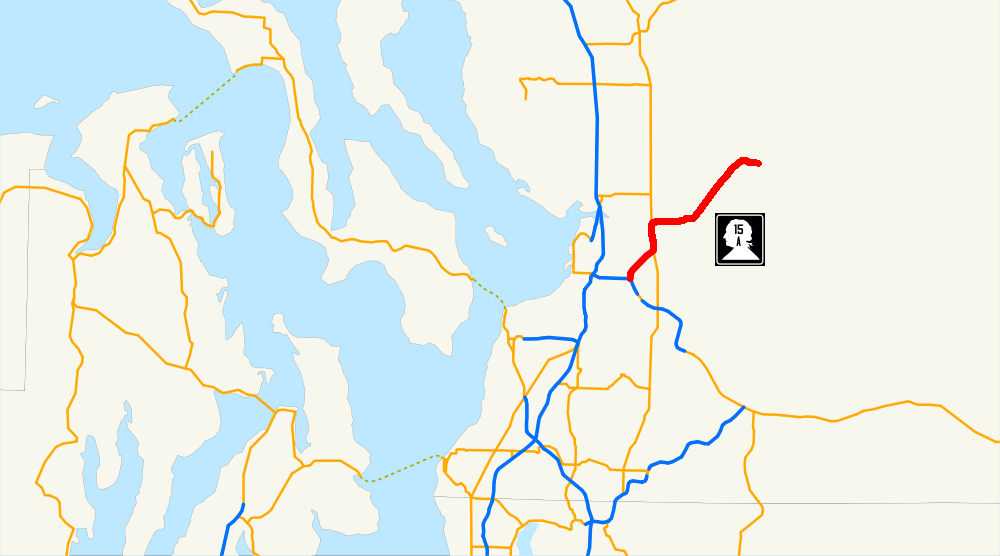
Before SR 92, SSH 15A (1937–1964) used the route as the eastern segment of itself.

Before SR 92, the Monte Cristo and Everett Railroad used the route, shown on two different maps from 1899 and 1911. A highway was built along the route in the late 1910s, connecting to the Pacific Highway west of Lake Stevens. The railroad was replaced with Secondary State Highway 15A (SSH 15A) during the creation of the Primary and secondary state highways in 1937. SSH 15A ran from Primary State Highway 15, later concurrent with U.S. Route 2 (US 2) by 1946, northeast to a brief concurrency with SSH 1A and then northeast once again to Granite Falls. The eastern terminus of SR 92, the Mountain Loop Highway, was completed in December 1941. The Washington State Legislature established the current numbering system during the 1964 highway renumbering and SSH 15A was divided into three new highways, SR 204, SR 9 and SR 92. By 1966, SR 9 between Lake Stevens and Arlington was not complete as was SR 92 between the current western terminus and North Machias Road.

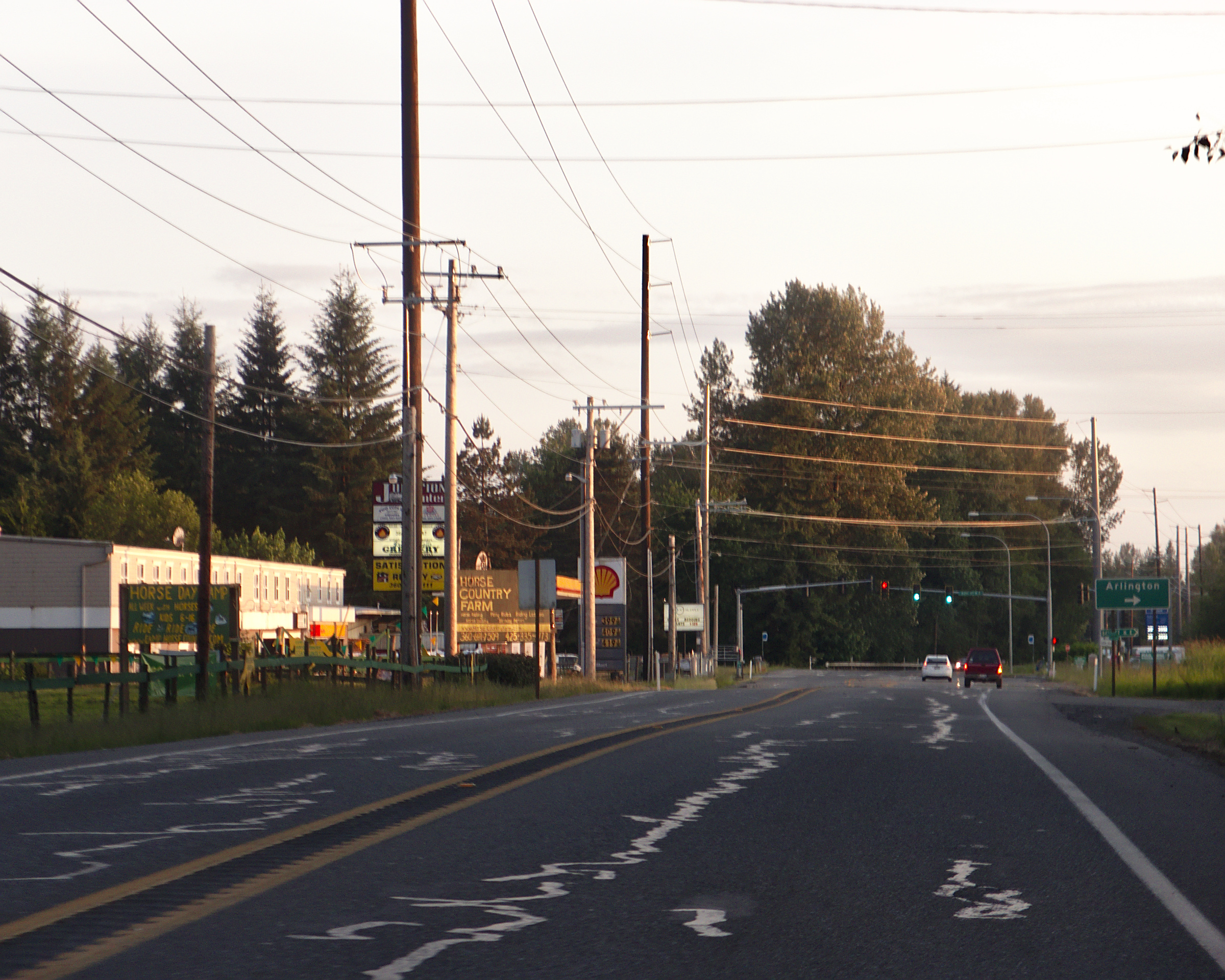
Looking southwest just north of 84th St NE

The Washington State Department of Transportation (WSDOT) has been improving the roadway since 2005. The first project was completed in October 2005 and replaced a culvert on Stevens Creek with a bridge, located between Lake Road and 99th Avenue, 0.46 miles (0.74 km) east of the SR 9 intersection. A second project completed in September 2006 widened the highway and improved intersections between SR 9 and 84th Street (Getchell Road). In 2007, a road was proposed to run from 44th Street Northeast in Marysville to SR 92's western terminus and was later canceled. A third project added guardrails on US 2 and SR 92 west of Granite Falls. A truck bypass of Granite Falls and SR 92 has been completed; the 2.1-mile (3.4 km) long route runs through Indian camps, where artifacts have been uncovered. Three roundabouts were installed on the bypass: at the SR 92, 100th Street and Jordan Road intersections, which decrease heavy vehicle traffic through Granite Falls. The roundabout connecting the alternate route to SR 92 opened in May 2010 and the entire route was inaugurated on November 19. It was then transferred to the state government in 2011.

== Major intersections ==
The entire route is in Snohomish County.

Location	mi	km	Destinations	Notes
Lake Stevens	0.00	0.00	SR 9 – Snohomish, Arlington	
Granite Falls	7.26	11.68	SR 92 Spur east (Stanley Street) – Granite Falls	Roundabout
Granite Falls	9.16	14.74	Mountain Loop Highway	
1.000 mi = 1.609 km; 1.000 km = 0.621 mi

== Spur route ==
State Route 92 Spur
- Location: Granite Falls
- Length: 0.08 mi (130 m)
- Existed: 2011–present

SR 92 has a short spur route in western Granite Falls, traveling 0.08 miles (0.13 km) along 96th Street from the Quarry Road roundabout to the city limits of Granite Falls, where it becomes Stanley Street. It follows the former alignment of SR 92 prior to the opening of the Quarry Road truck bypass route. An average of 9,500 vehicles use the road on a daily basis, according to annual daily traffic data measured by WSDOT in 2016.
