= Centennial Trail =

Centennial Trail may refer to:

- Black Hills Centennial Trail, South Dakota, United States
- Centennial Trail (Illinois), in Chicago
- North Idaho Centennial Trail, Idaho, United States
- Centennial Trail (Montana), in Helena
- Snohomish County Centennial Trail, Washington (U.S. state)
- Spokane River Centennial Trail, Washington (U.S. state)
- Centennial Trail (Manitoba), in Whiteshell Provincial Park

== See also ==
- Centennial trail
