= Tsubaki Grand Shrine of America =

Shinto shrine in Granite Falls, Washington, US

Tsubaki Grand Shrine of America アメリカ椿大神社
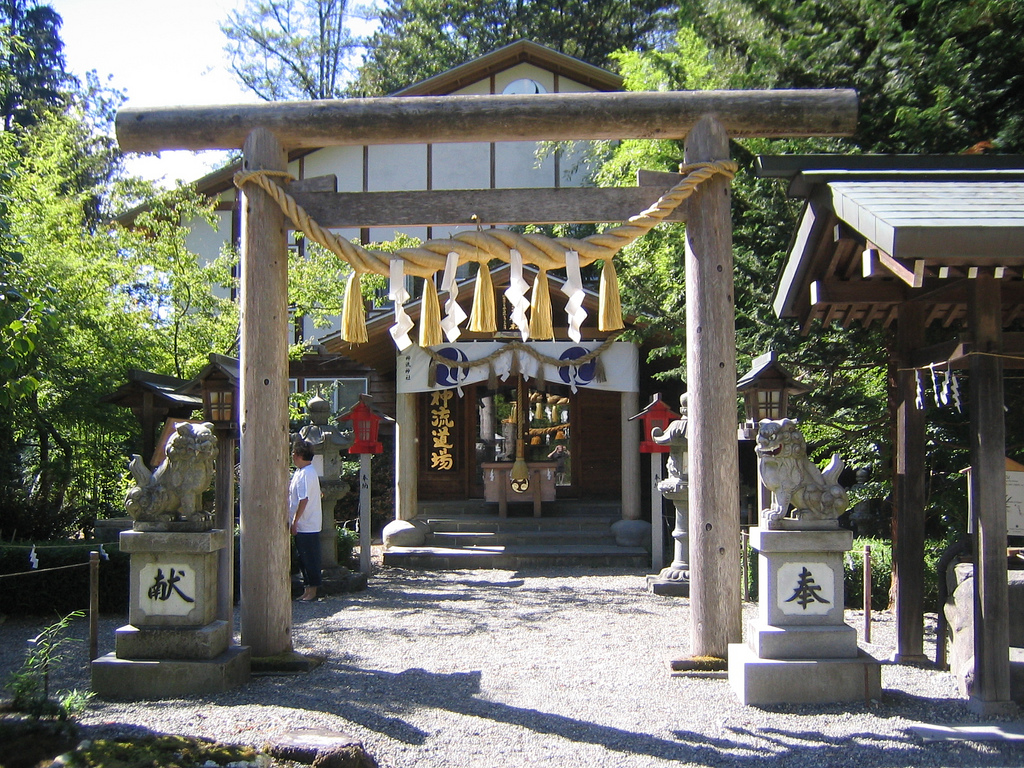

- Location within Washington (state) Location within the United States

Religion
- Affiliation: Shinto
- Deity: Sarutahiko-no-Ōkami; Ame-no-Uzume-no-Mikoto
- Leadership: Rev. Koichi Barrish

Location
- Location: 17720 Crooked Mile Road; Granite Falls, Washington 98252; United States
- Coordinates: 48°4′51.88″N 121°59′33.19″W

Architecture
- Established: 1986

Website
- www.tsubakishrine.org

Tsubaki Grand Shrine of America, also sometimes known as Tsubaki America Jinja or in Japanese as amerika tsubaki ōkamiyashiro (アメリカ椿大神社), was the first Shinto shrine built in the mainland United States after World War II. It was erected in 1986 in Stockton, California, and moved to its next location in Granite Falls, Washington, where it resided from 2001 to 2023.

In 2023, the shrine relocated to Shin Mei Spiritual Centre on Knapp Island near Victoria, British Columbia, Canada. Ceremony was conducted to move the Gosaijin:(enshrined Kami/Spirits) Sarutahiko-no-Ōkami, ancestor of all earthly Kami and Kami of progressing positively in harmony with Divine Nature; and his wife Ame-no-Uzume-no-Mikoto, Kami of arts and entertainment, harmony, meditation and joy. Also enshrined are Amaterasu Ōmikami (Kami of the Sun), Ugamitama-no-Ōkami (Kami of foodstuffs and things to sustain human life/Oinarisama), and America Kokudo Kunitama-no-Kami (protector of the North America Continent).

The shrine is now known as Tsubaki Dai Jinja North America (or, Hoku Bei Tsubaki Dai Jinja 北米椿大神社). It continues as a branch of Tsubaki Ōkami Yashiro, one of the oldest and most notable shrines in Japan.

The Guji of Tsubaki Dai Jinja North America is Ann Evans, whose norito translations are widely used in the western Shinto community.

== Gallery ==
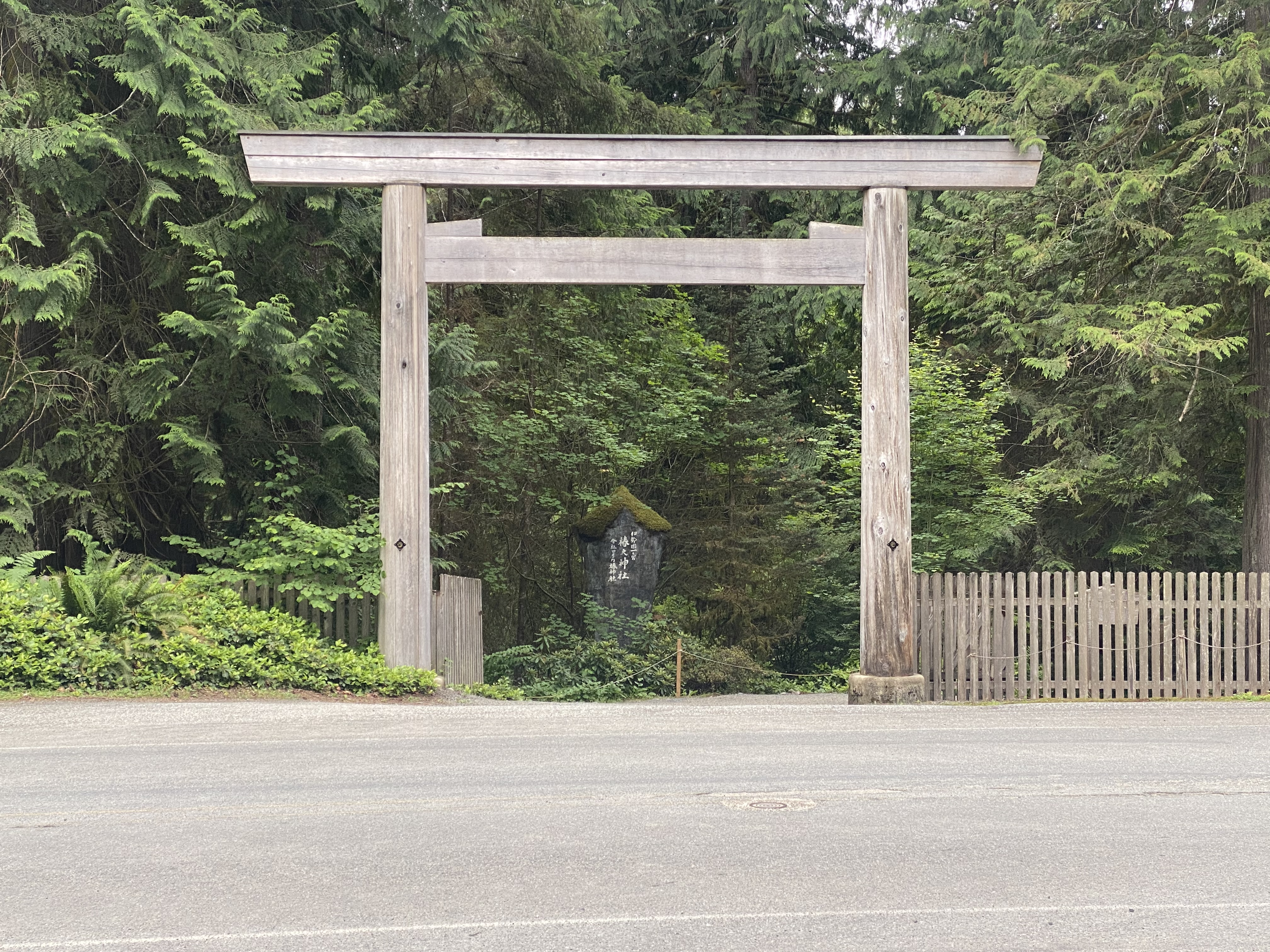
Torii at the entrance from the road

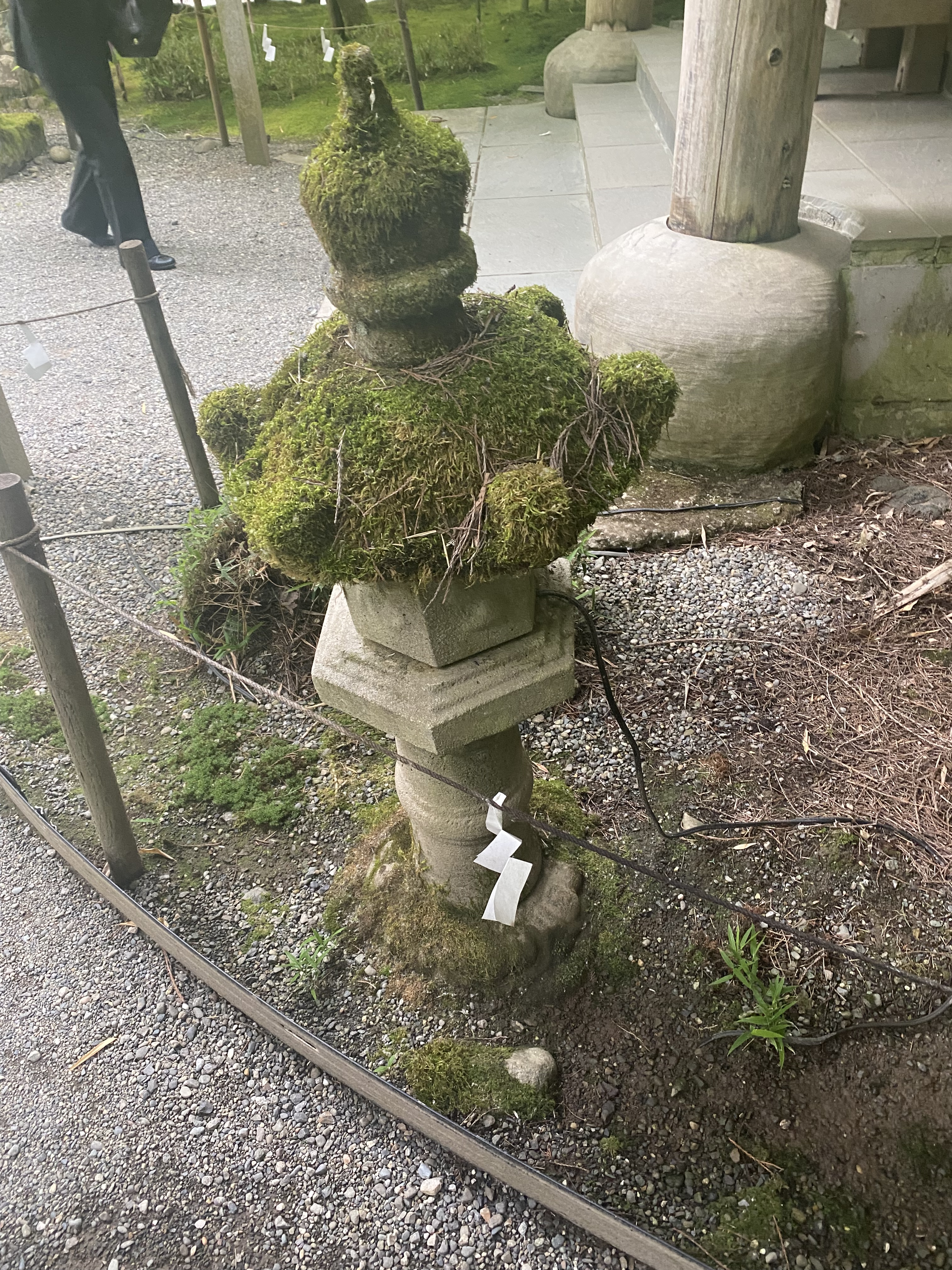
A lantern

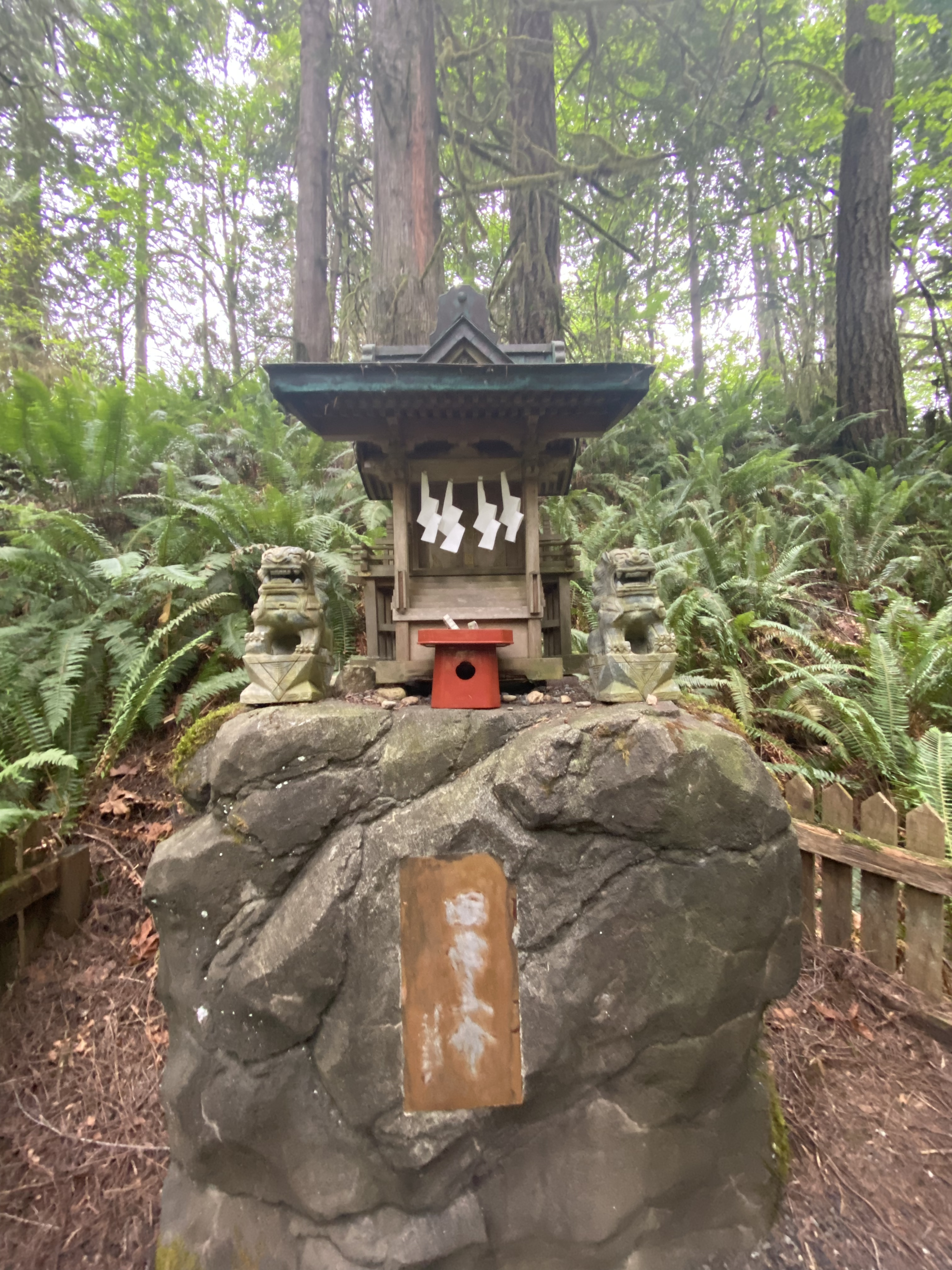
A Setsumatsusha

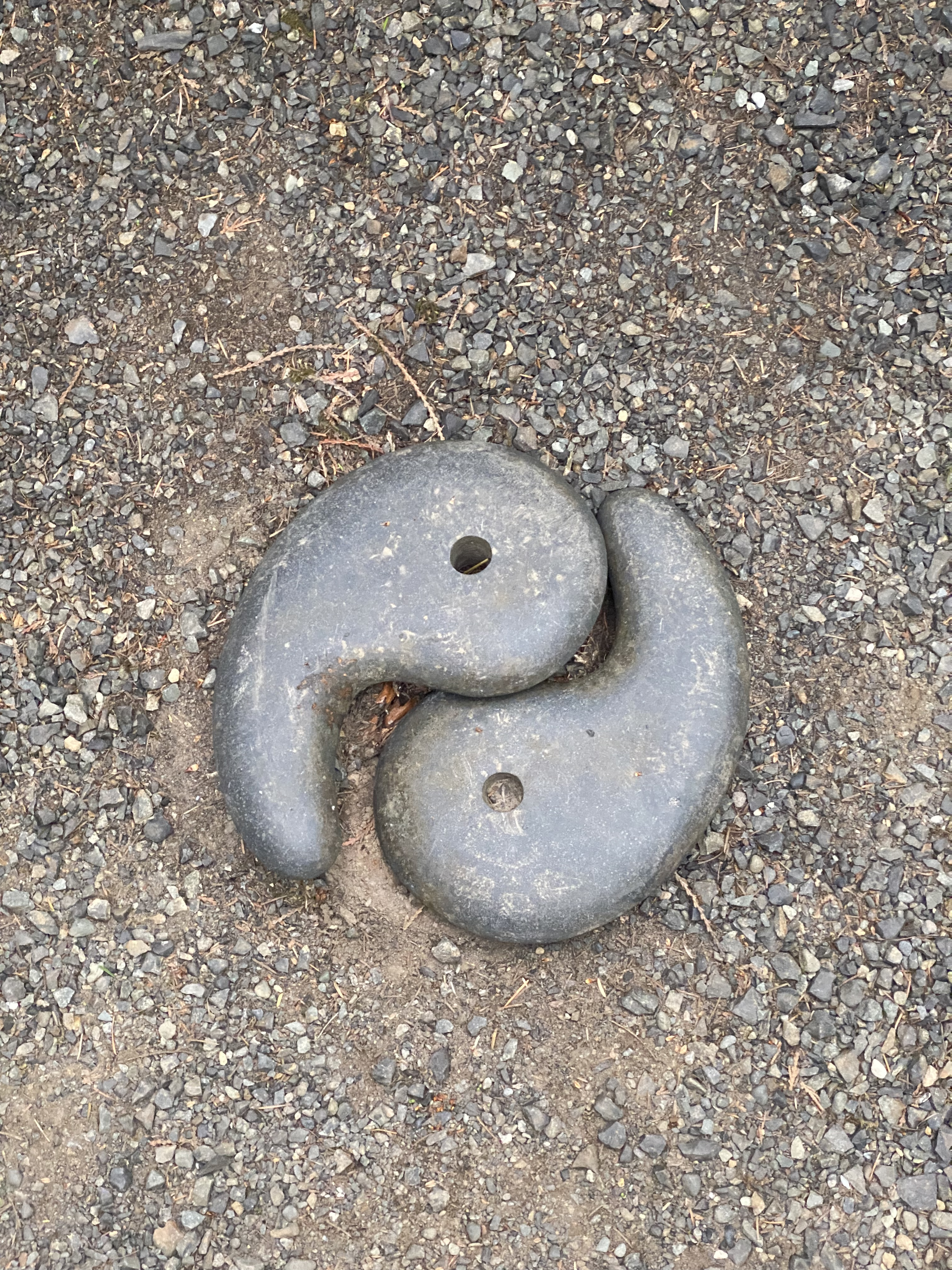
Two Magatama

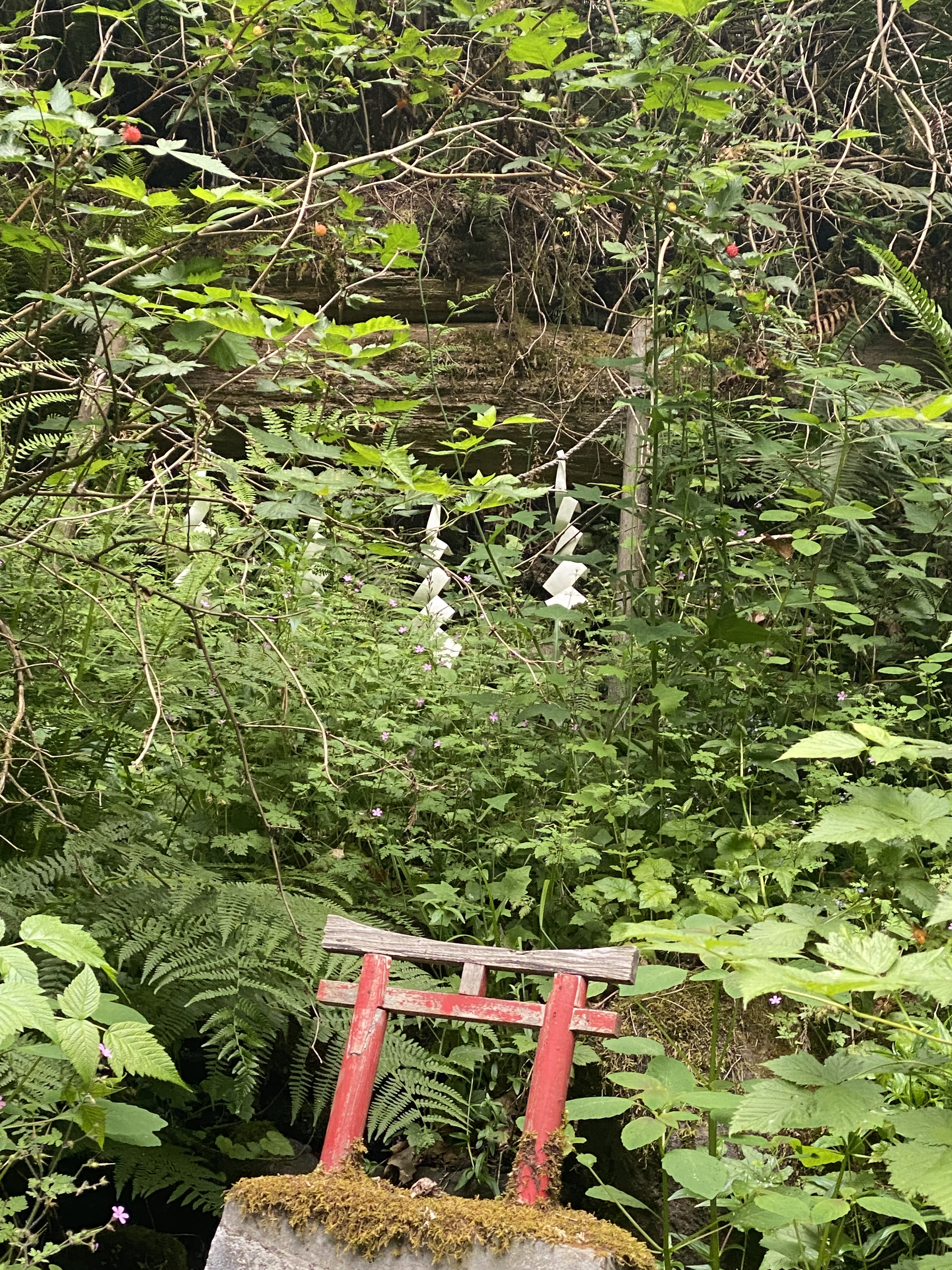
A hokora along the stream

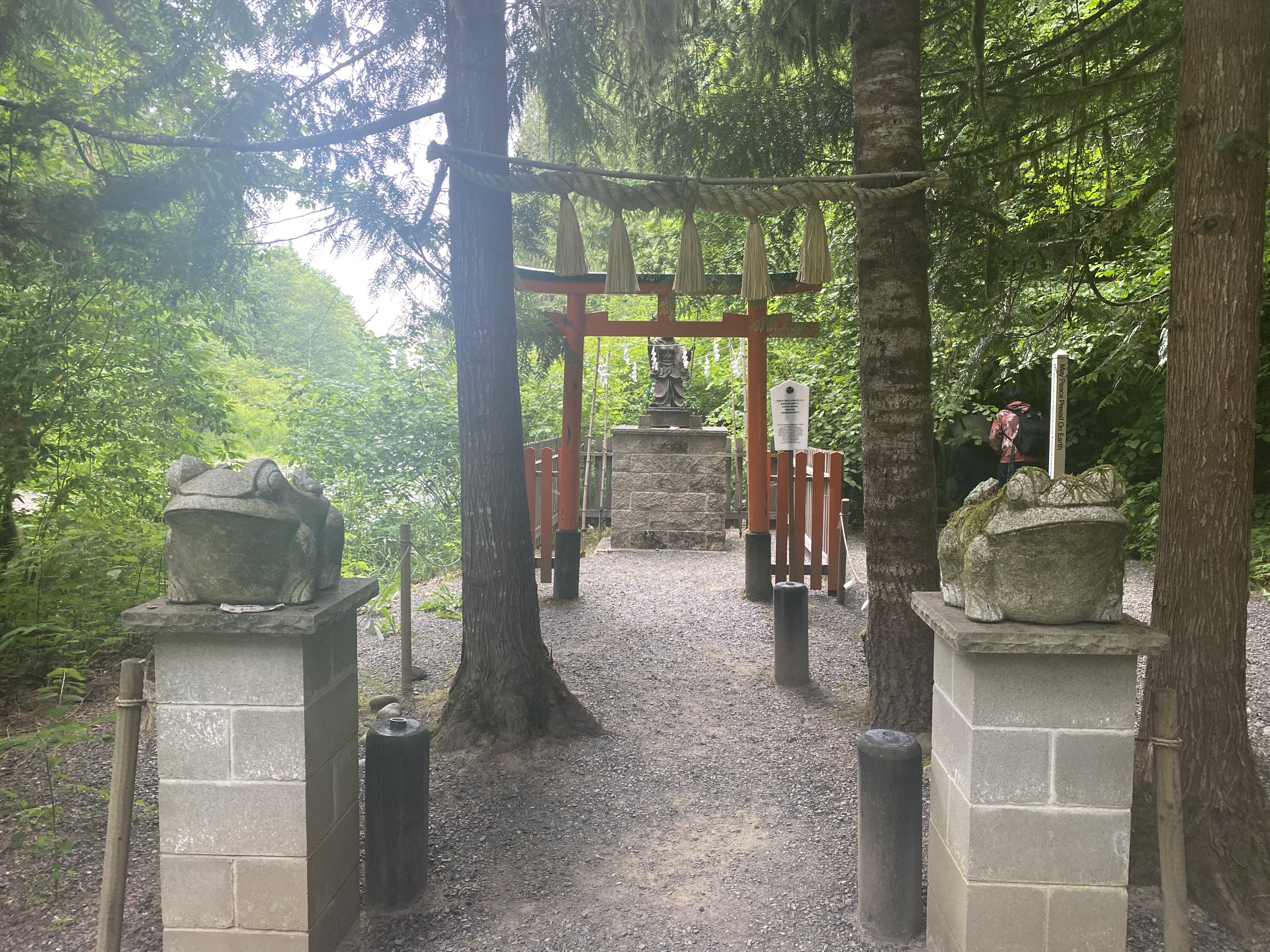
Frog statues in front of a statue of Ame no Uzume

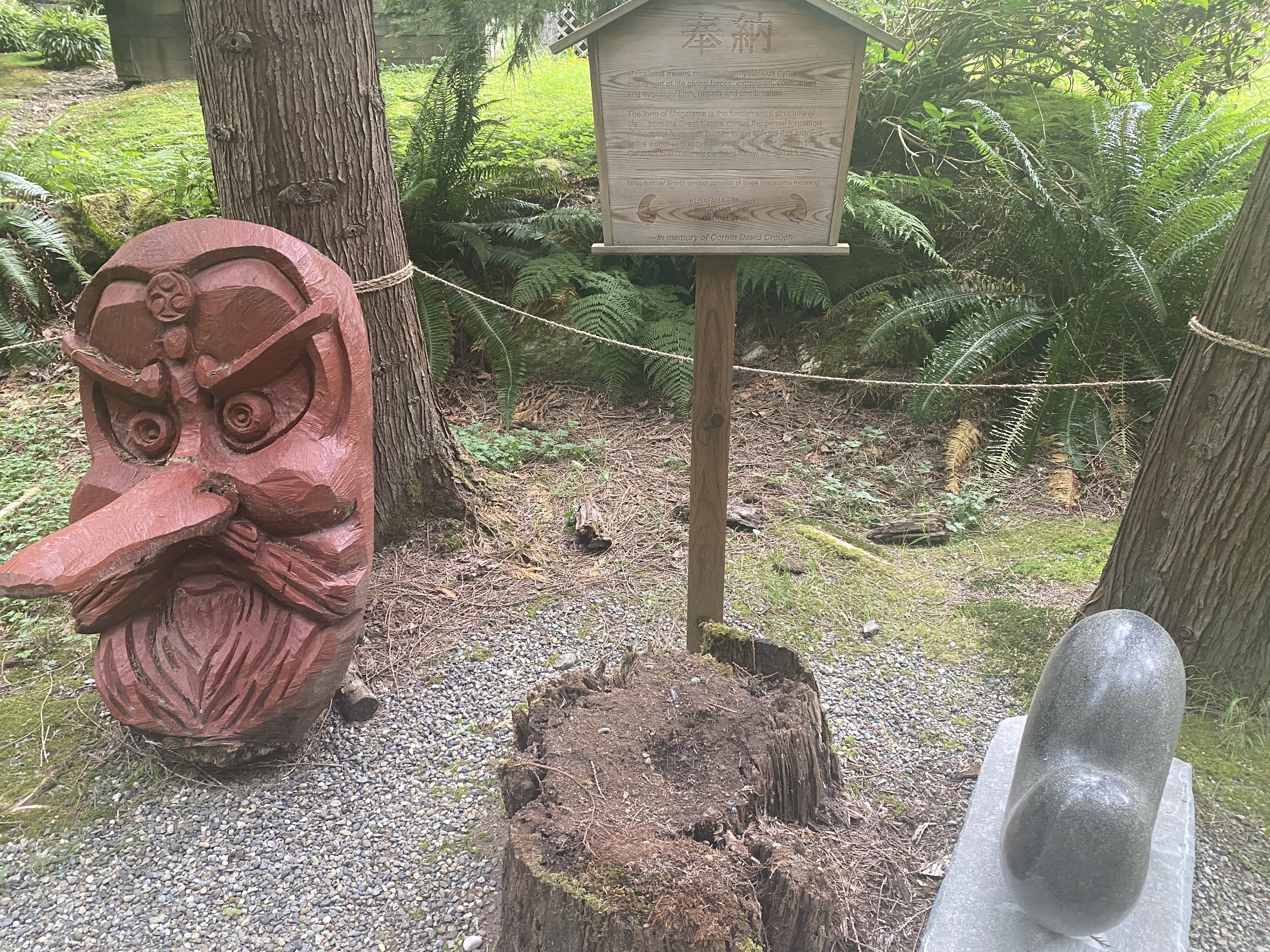
Sculptures

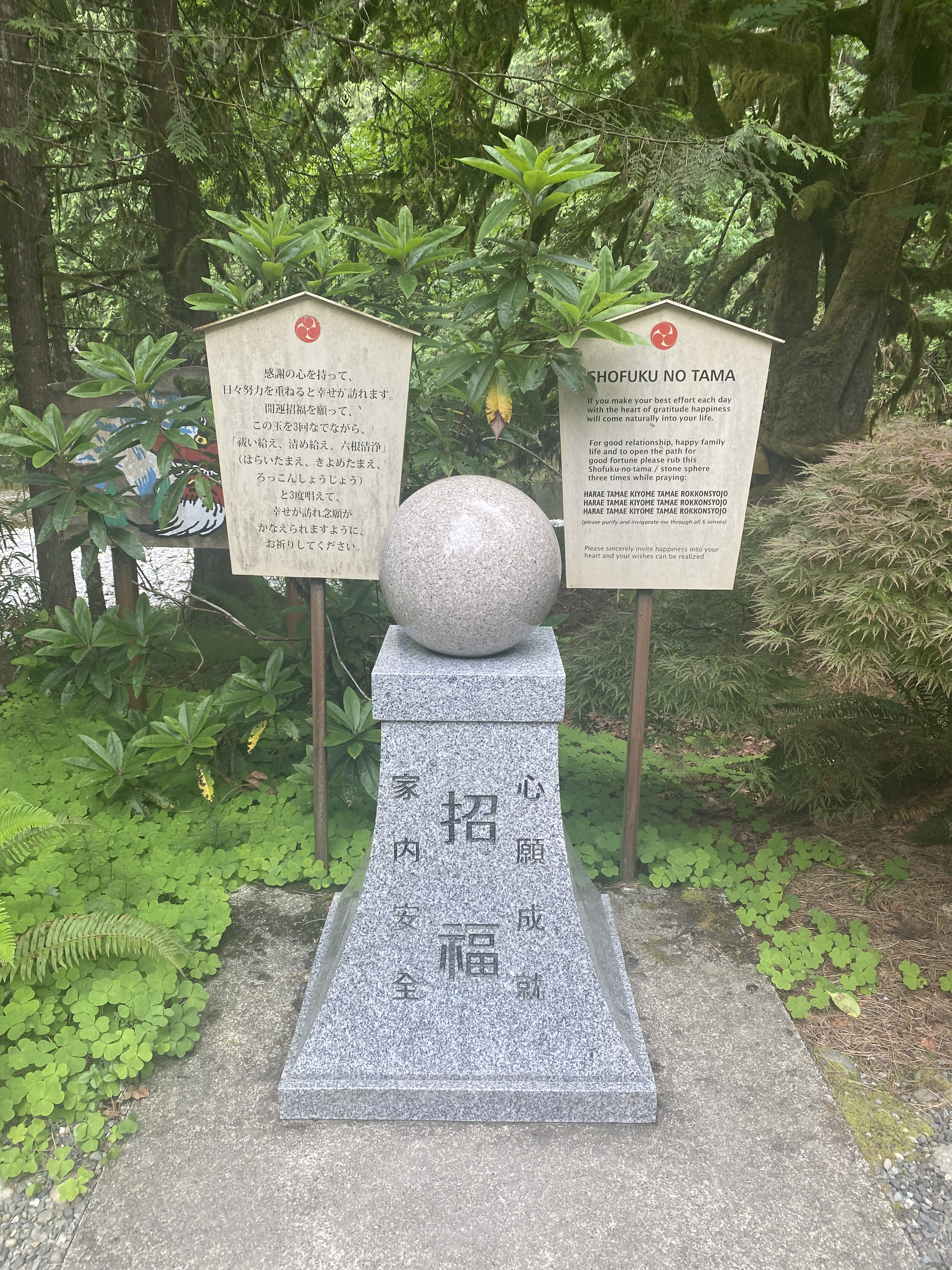
Shofuku no Tama

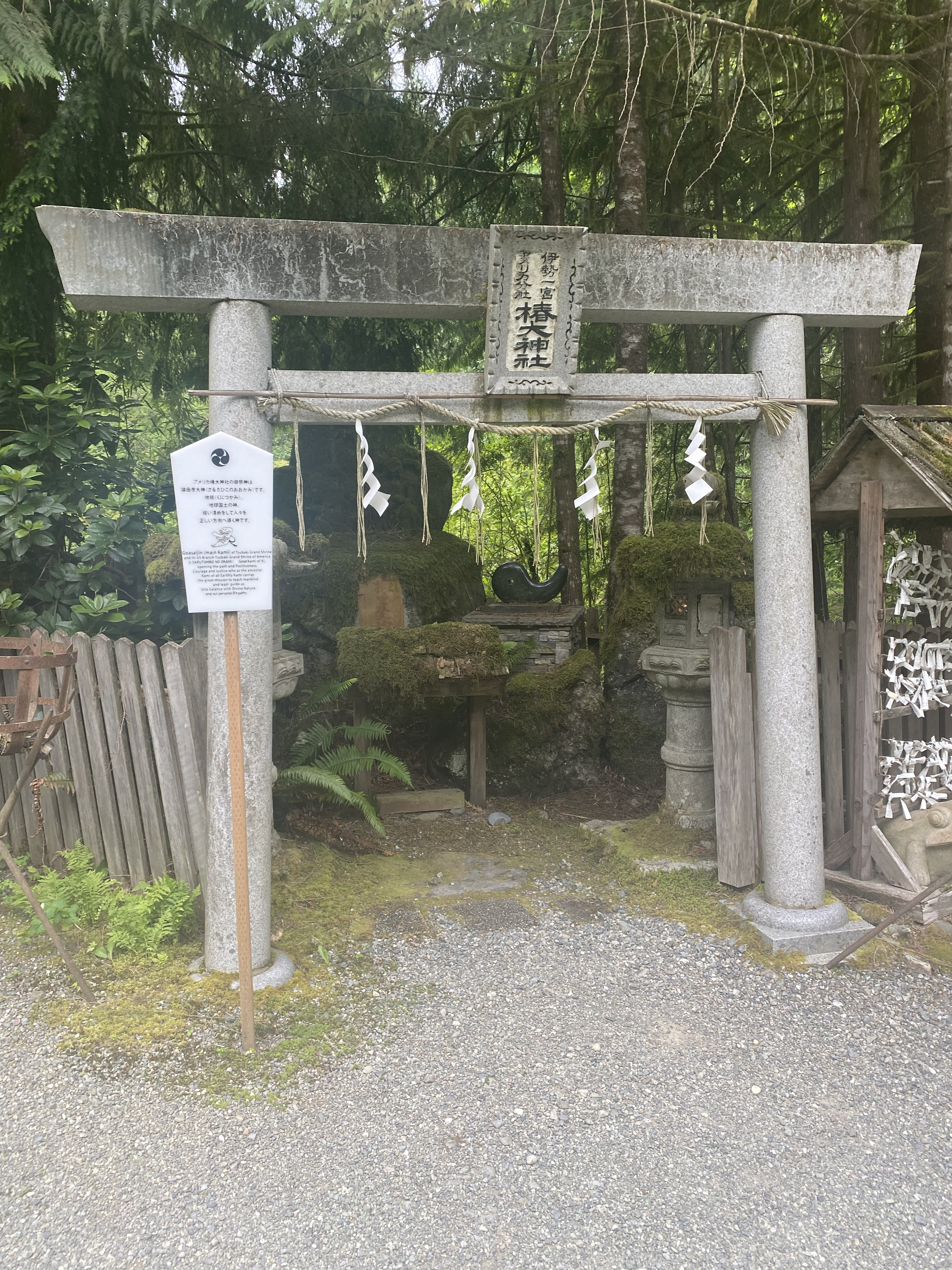
Torii into a Setsumatsusha

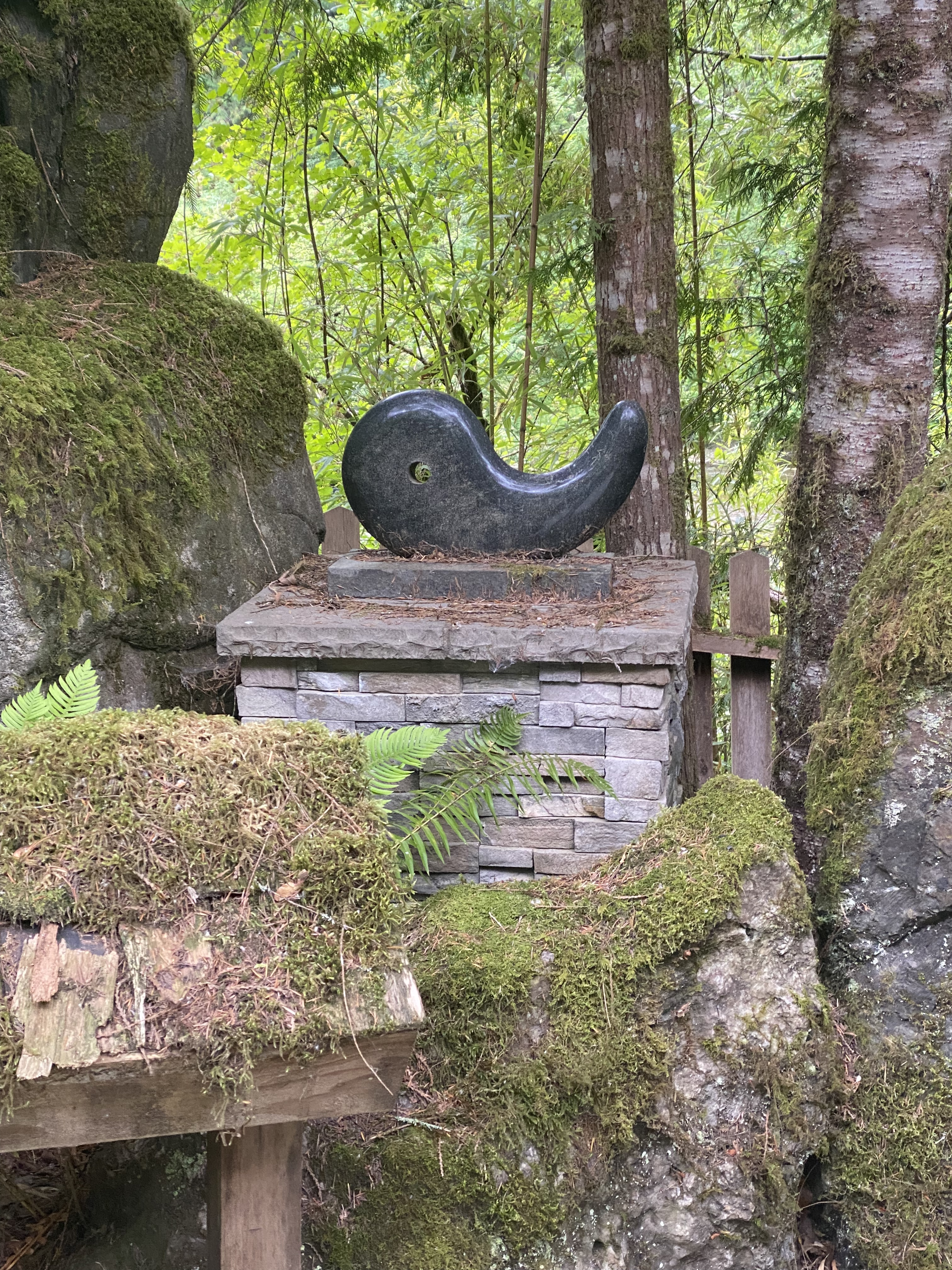
Magatama

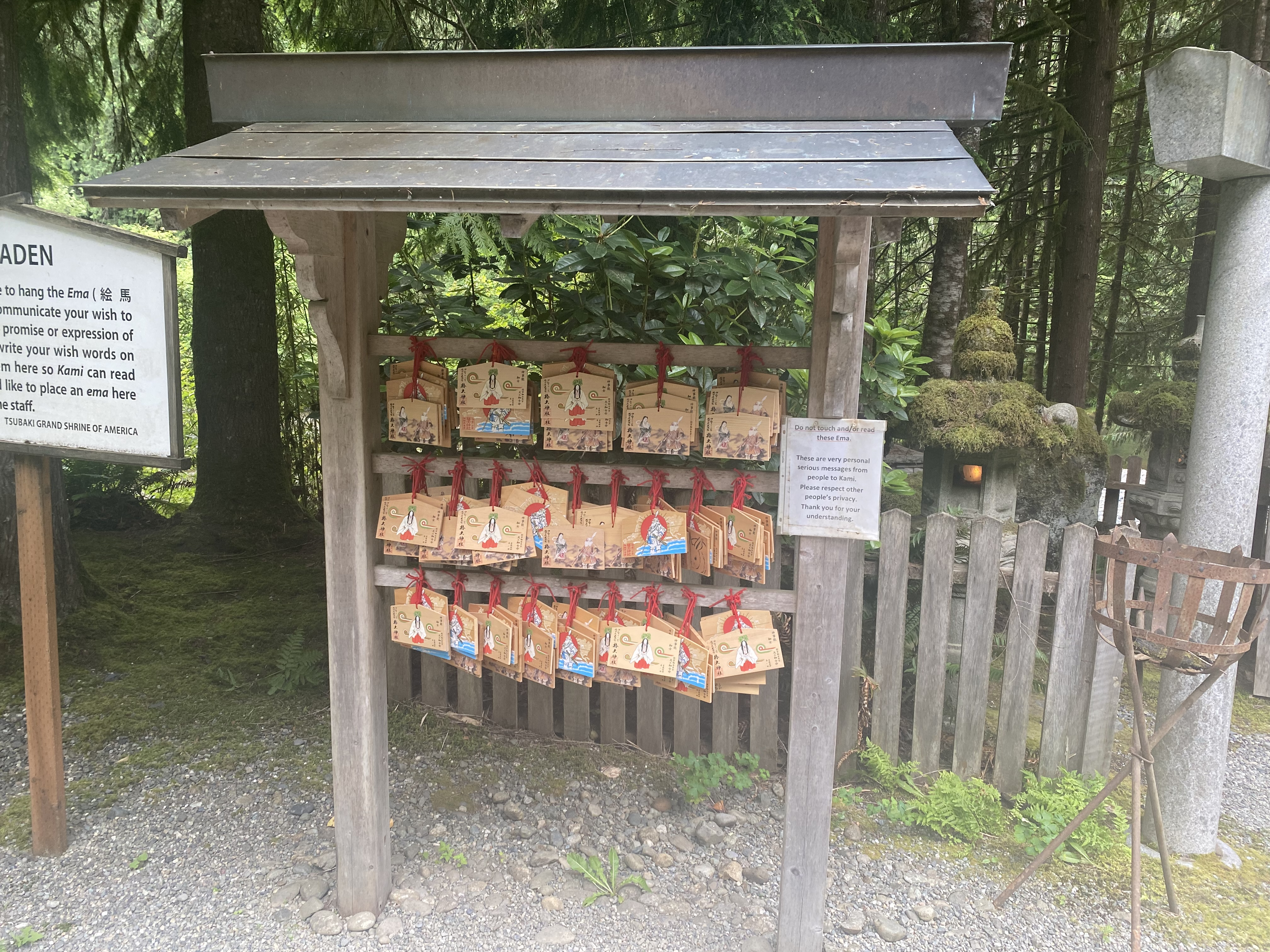
Ema

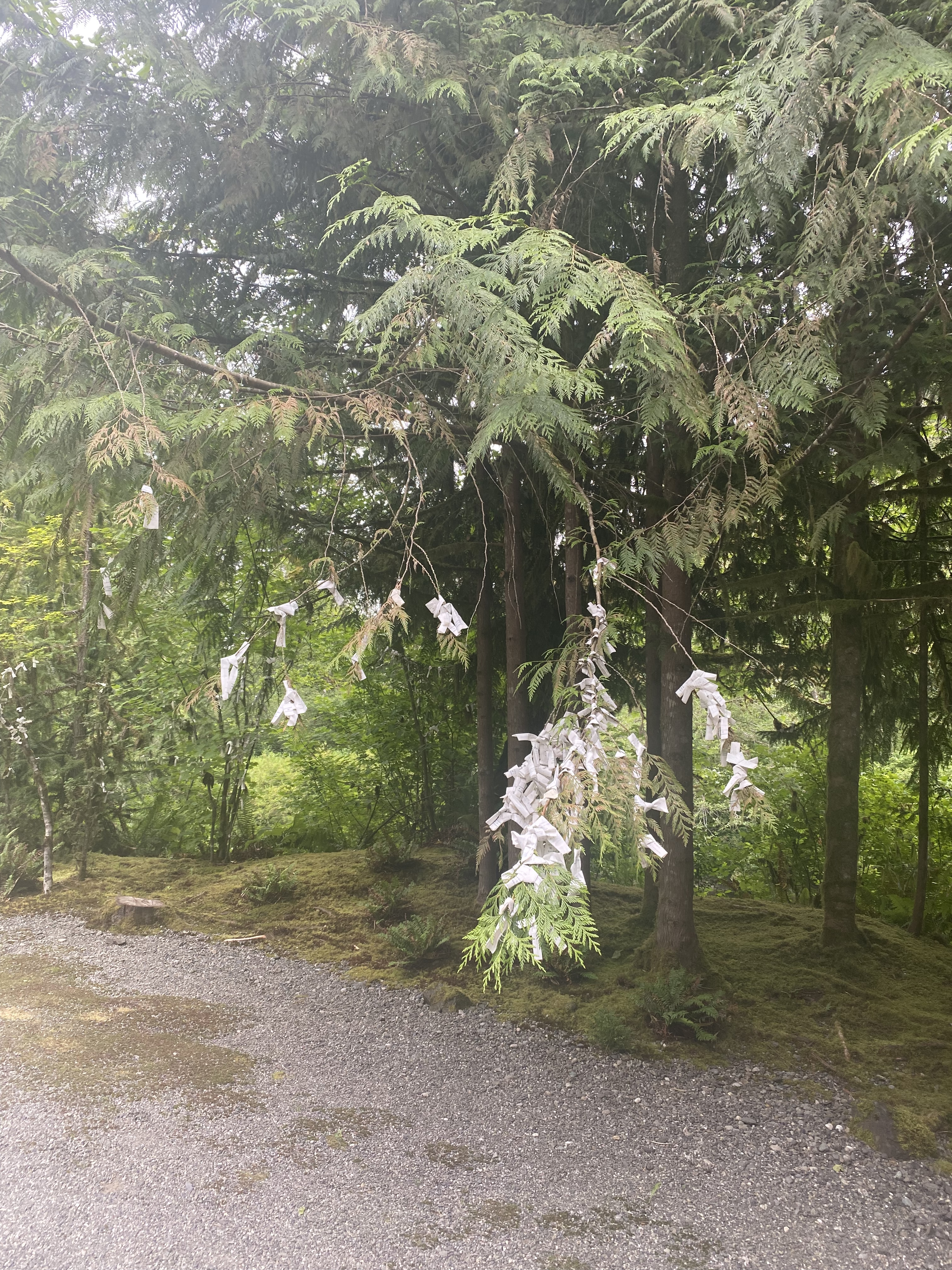
O-mikuji

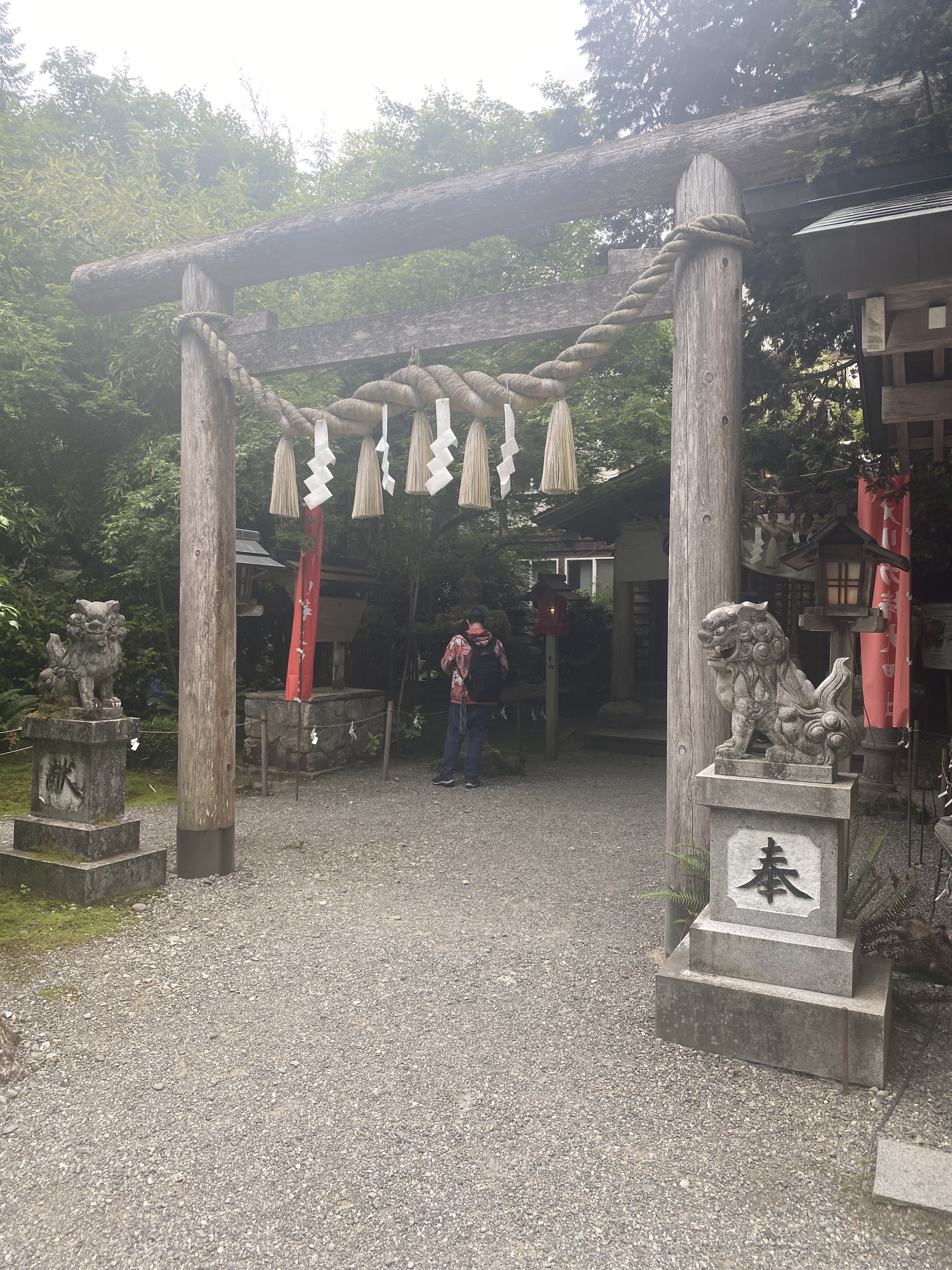
The main Torii

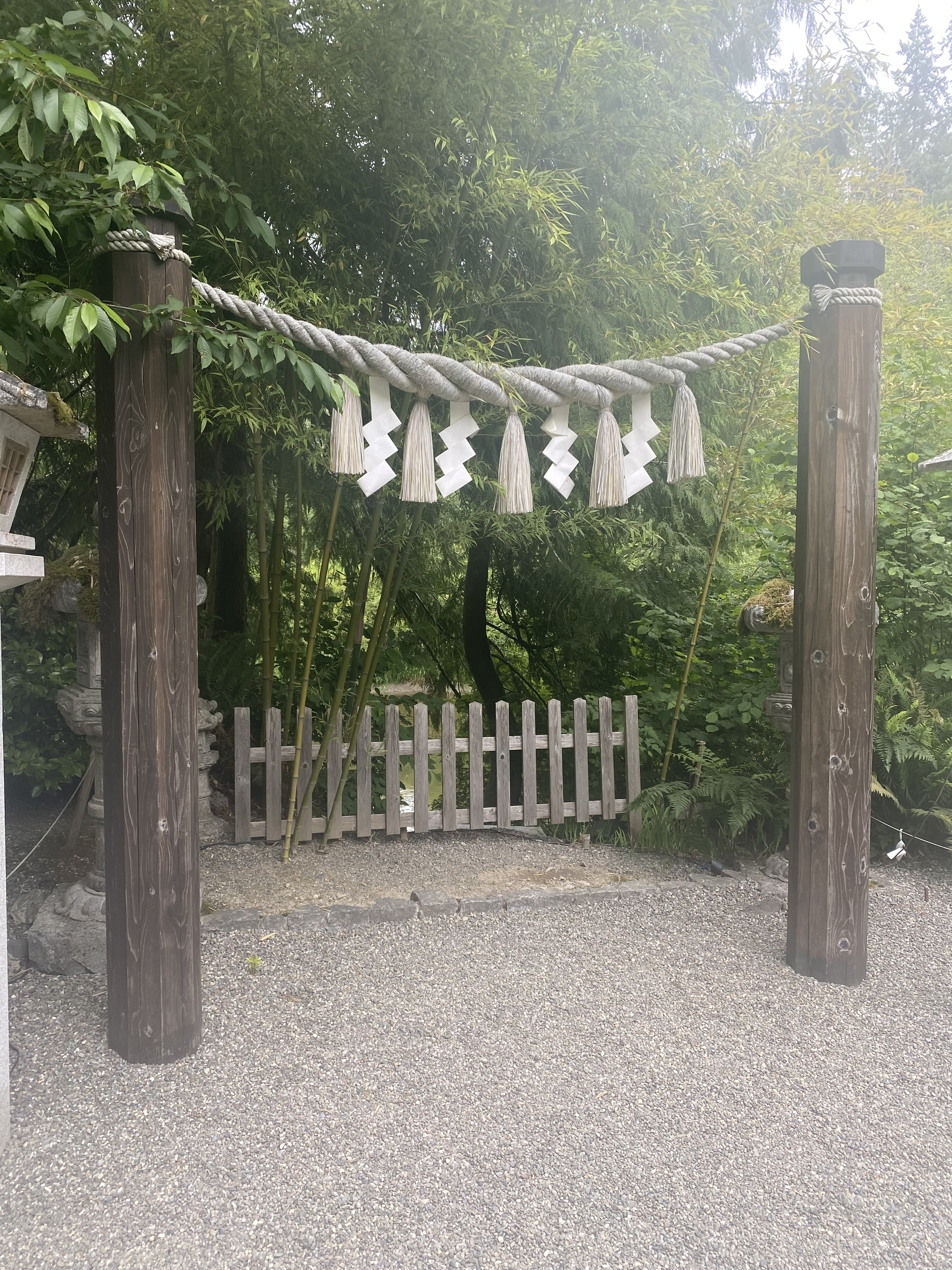
Torii reverse from the main Torii

== See also ==
- Misogi
- List of Shinto shrines in the United States
