= Centennial trail =

A Centennial Trail is either a trail created to celebrate a centennial, or the memorialization of a path or trail that has endured for a century. These can be, but are not necessarily, rail trails.

== Centennial Trails in the United States ==
- Centennial Trail - South Dakota
- Centennial Trail - Illinois
- Ocala National Forest Centennial OHV Trail - Florida
- North Idaho Centennial Trail - Idaho
- Snohomish County Centennial Trail - Washington
- Spokane River Centennial Trail - Washington

== Centennial Trails in Canada ==
- Centennial Trail (Manitoba) - Whiteshell Provincial Park

== See also ==
- Centennial Trail (disambiguation)
