= Snohomish County Centennial Trail =

Rail trail in Washington, United States

Coordinates: 47°55′14″N 122°05′08″W

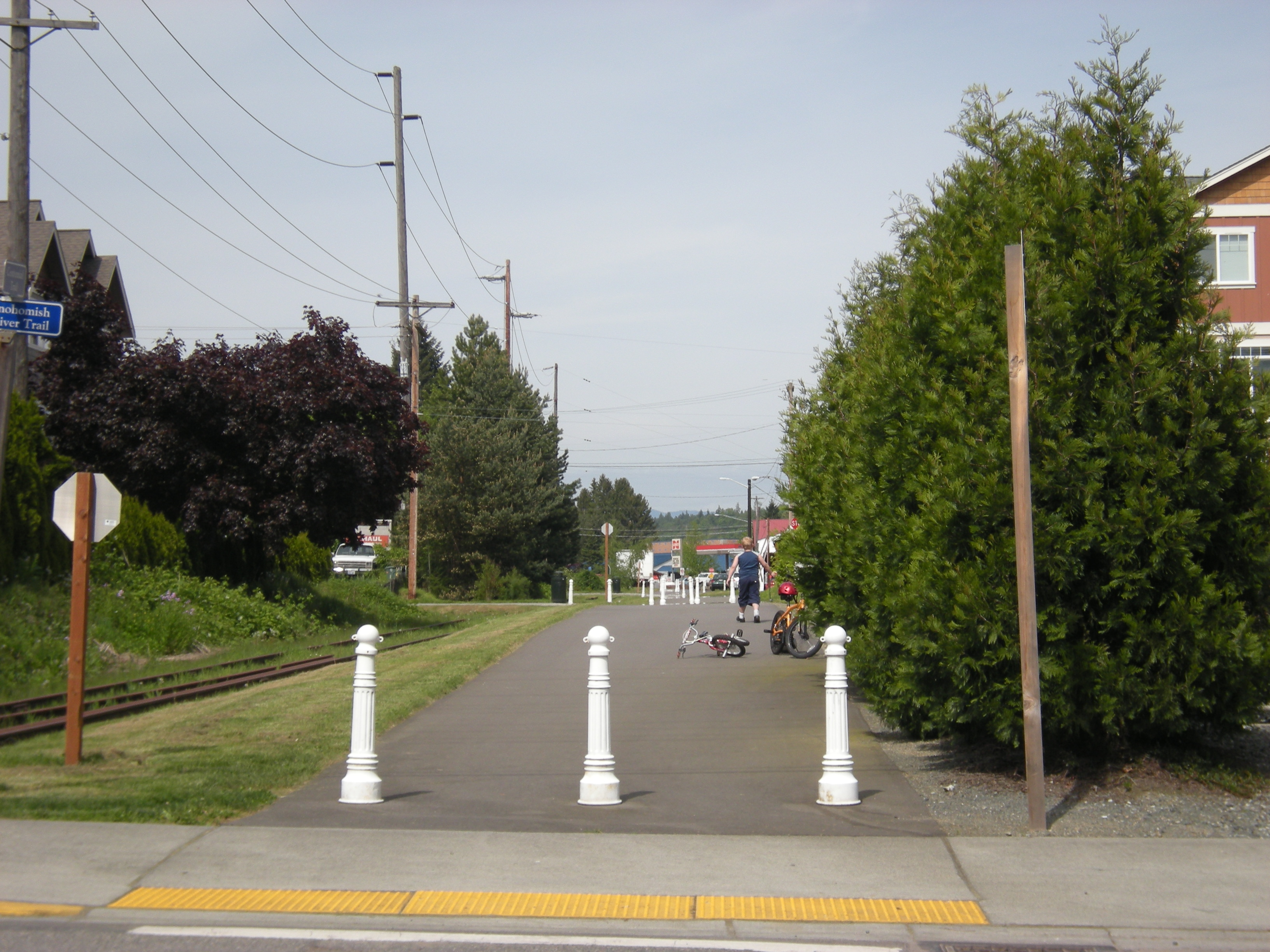
- Start of the trail near downtown Snohomish
- Length: 30.0 miles (48.3 km)
- Location: Snohomish County, Washington
- Began construction: 1989
- Completed: 2013
- Designation: National Recreation Trail, 1992
- Trailheads: Snohomish to Skagit County line, south of Lake McMurray, Washington
- Use: Non-motorized, equestrian
- Sights: Public art
- Hazards: Road crossings
- Maintainer: Snohomish County Parks and Recreation

The Snohomish County Centennial Trail is a 30-mile-long (48 km) rail trail in Snohomish County, Washington, connecting the cities of Snohomish, Lake Stevens, and Arlington to Skagit County along the corridor of Washington State Route 9. The trail, administered by Snohomish County Parks and Recreation, is on the former right-of-way of the Seattle, Lake Shore and Eastern Railway and comprises a 10-foot-wide (3.0 m) non-motorized trail and a 6-foot-wide (1.8 m) equestrian trail. The first segment of the corridor was opened in 1989, the centennial of the statehood of Washington, and the final segment between Arlington and the Skagit County line was opened in 2013.

== Trail Route ==
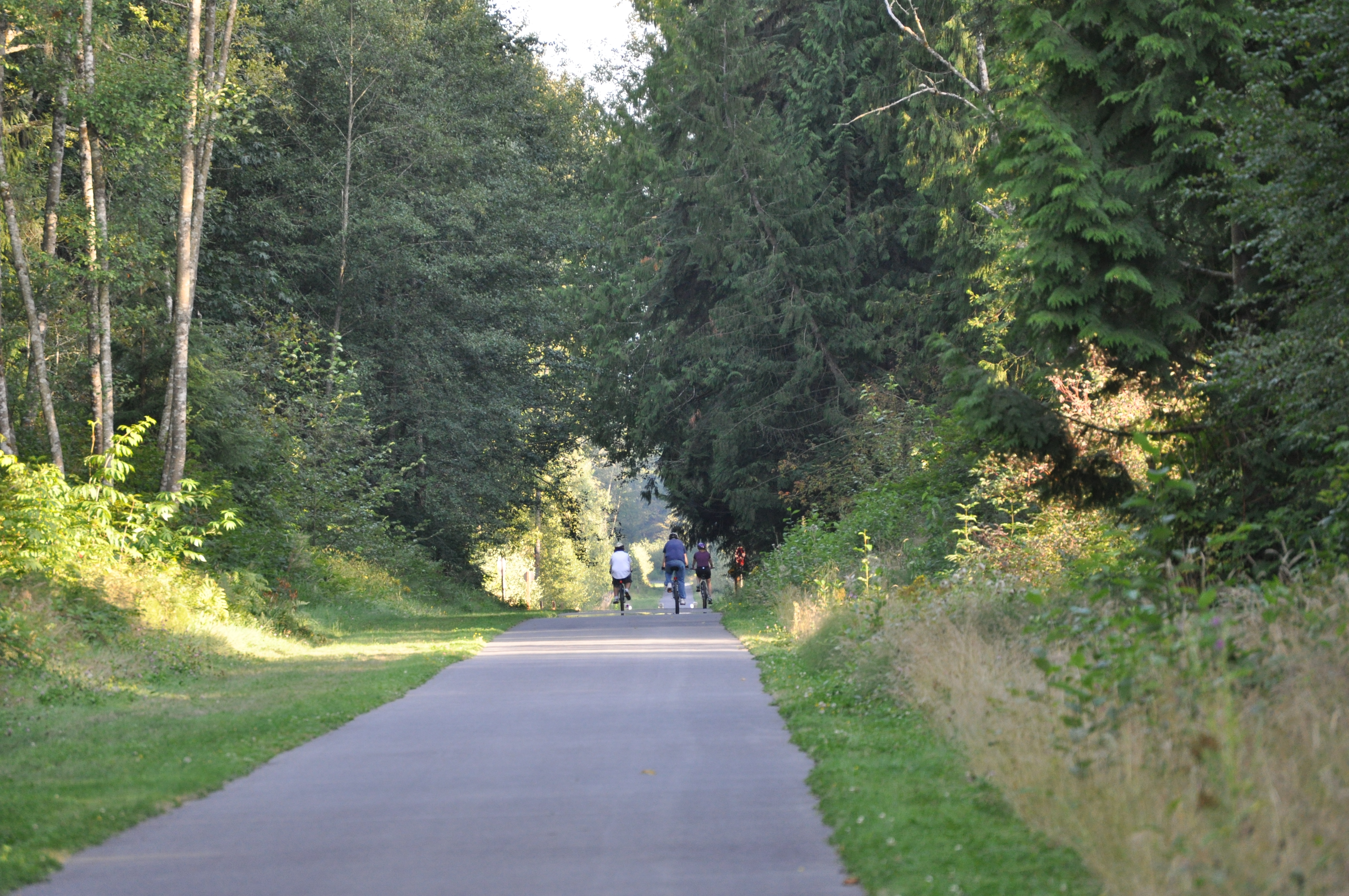
Looking southbound on the trail north of Lake Stevens

The trail begins as a continuation of the Snohomish River Trail at the intersection of Maple Avenue and Pine Street in Snohomish, named the Snohomish trailhead. The route travels northeast along Maple Avenue, which becomes Machias Road past Snohomish city limits, and the Pilchuck River to the Pilchuck trailhead, located south of an underpass of U.S. Route 2. The trail continues north into Machias, where it passes through the Machias and 20th Street trailheads before turning northwest as the railbed approaches Lake Stevens and an underpass of Washington State Route 92 and its trailhead. The Centennial Trail travels towards Lake Cassidy, where it passes the Rhododendron trailhead, named for the state flower, and the Lake Cassidy Wetlands Park trailhead. The trail continues northwest under 84th Street and Washington State Route 9, the former of which has its own trailhead. The route begins paralleling 67th Avenue NE as it enters the Quilceda Creek watershed at the Armar Road trailhead south of Arlington. The Centennial Trail and 67th Avenue enter Arlington city limits at an intersection with Washington State Route 531 before the roadway continues north into Downtown Arlington after an underpass with Washington State Route 9. The route continues through Downtown Arlington along West Avenue before a former railroad trestle carries the trail across the Stillaguamish River and towards Bryant along Washington State Route 9. The Centennial Trail passes its final trailhead, the Nakashima Heritage Barn & Centennial Trail North, before ending at the Skagit County line south of Lake McMurray.

== History ==
The Centennial Trail runs on the right-of-way of the Sumas Branch of the former Seattle, Lake Shore and Eastern Railway, built in 1889. The railway connected Seattle with Canada and linked eastward toward Stevens Pass with mail, freight, and passenger service. The line specialized in transporting timber, lumber and metals, and also served tourists visiting Monte Cristo, the Stillaguamish River, and the Big Four Inn at the Mountain Loop ice caves.

Later purchased by Northern Pacific then Burlington Northern, the Hartford (Lake Stevens) - Edgecomb (Arlington) section was abandoned 1972 and the Snohomish - Hartford (Lake Stevens) section was abandoned in 1987.

The rail trail project was first conceived in 1982, and development of the trail began in 1989 during Washington State's centennial. The trail was designated a National Recreation Trail in 1992. An additional 10-mile (16 km) section of the current 17.5 miles (28.2 km) opened in April 2005. A section of the trail extending approximately four miles northward from the City of Arlington to the unincorporated Town of Bryant was opened in November, 2010. A new section which has been called the "Gap" was completed in October 2011. This portion of the trail extends the trail from the Armar Road Trail head 1.2 miles to the Arlington City Limits. The section of trail from Bryant to the Skagit County line was opened officially on Nov 3, 2012.

== Future alignments ==
A future phase of the trail may connect with the Sammamish River and Burke-Gilman trails, both of which share the same right-of-way. Snohomish County plans to extend the trail southward to Woodinville and eastward to Monroe. In 2016, Snohomish county purchased the northern portion of the Eastside Rail Corridor with plans to align the King-Snohomish County rail line with the Centennial Trail right of way. The portion of rail line runs from the Woodinville-Maltby border to the City of Snohomish, and was purchased for the project from the Port of Seattle for $3.5 million using funds from the Snohomish County Conservation Futures Program. A similar project in nearby Kirkland opened a portion of the Eastside Rail Corridor to pedestrians in 2015 as part of the Cross Kirkland Corridor.

== Public Art ==
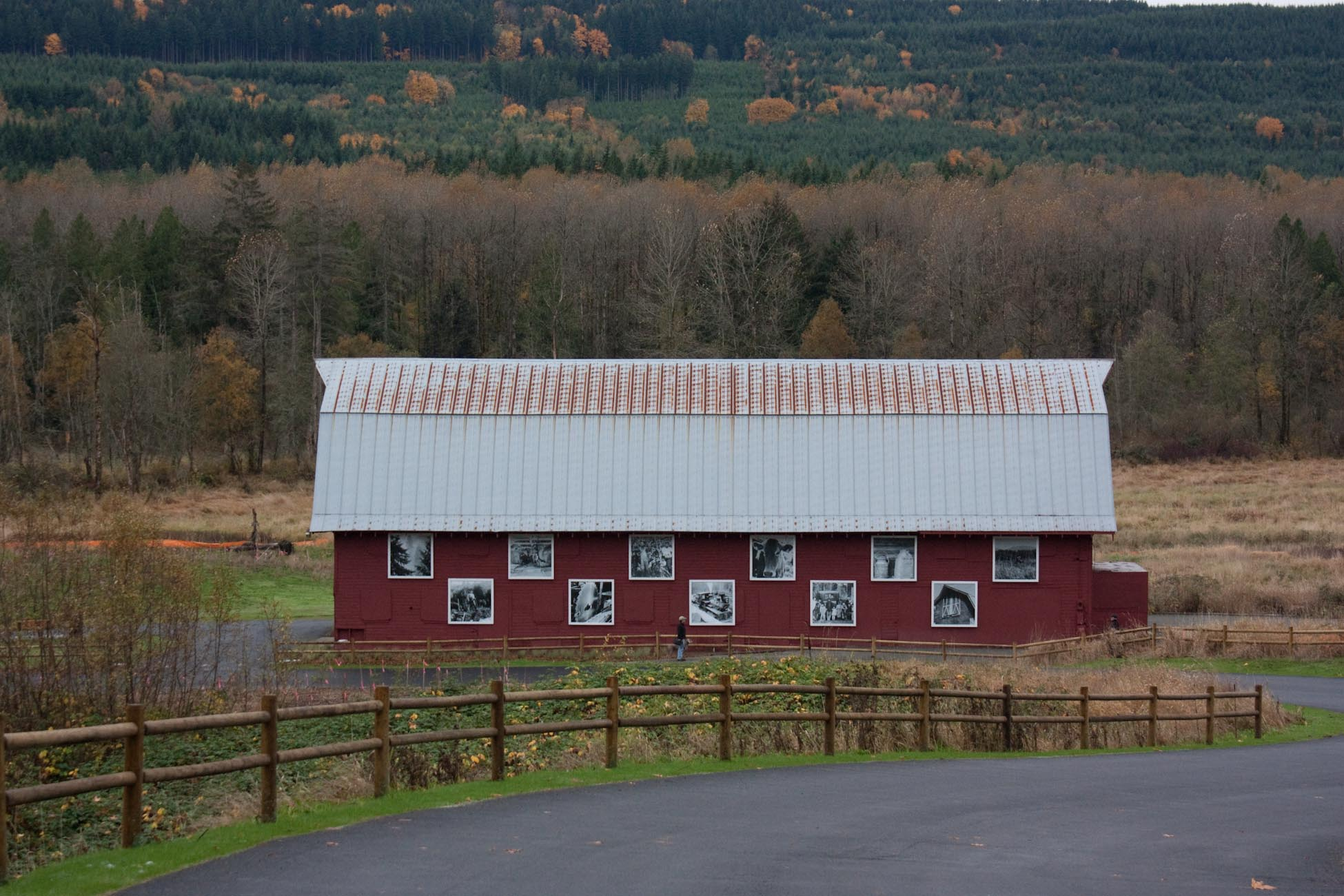
Nakashima Barn History Quilt Installation

The trail hosts several public art installations along the path. An installation titled, "History Quilt", on the Nakashima Barn, depicts the historical timeline of the site from native forest, to sawmill, to dairy farm, to the current recreational site. Artists Ellen Southard and Teresa Stern, of Site Story, wanted to celebrate the past while highlighting the Nakashima family, who were forced to sell the farm at pennies on the dollar due to internment during WWII. Future interpretive signage will also be featured at the site, and other locations along the trail.
