= Machias, Washington =

- CDP
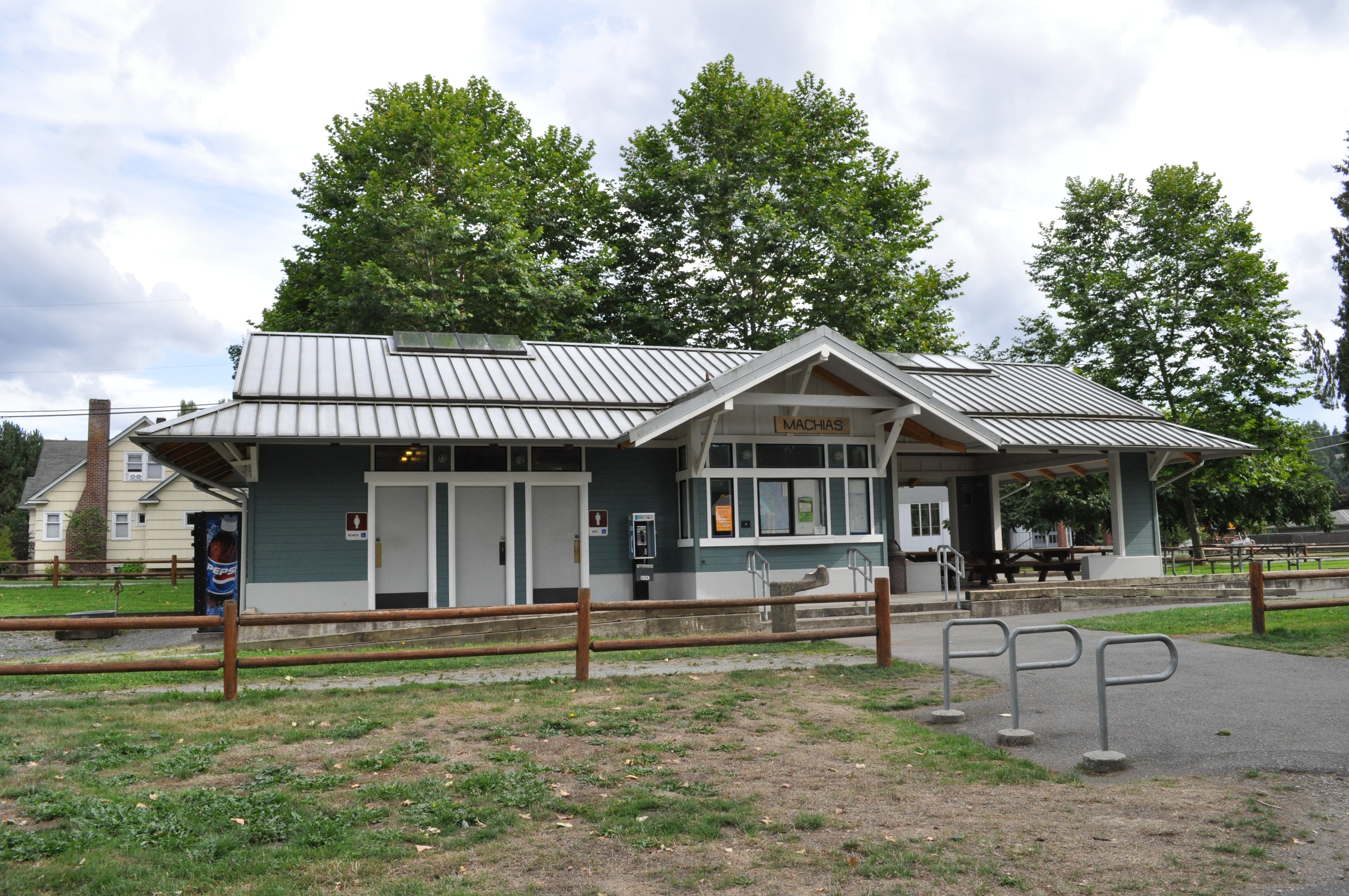
- The Machias trailhead on the Centennial Trail

- Location of Machias in Snohomish County
- Coordinates: 47°59′51″N 122°2′50″W
- Country: United States
- State: Washington
- County: Snohomish

Area
  - Total: 2.3 sq mi (5.9 km^{2})
  - Land: 2.3 sq mi (5.9 km^{2})
  - Water: 0 sq mi (0.0 km^{2})
- Elevation: 118 ft (36 m)

Population (2020)
  - Total: 1,264
  - Density: 550/sq mi (210/km^{2})
- Time zone: UTC-8 (Pacific (PST))
  - Summer (DST): UTC-7 (PDT)
- ZIP code: 98290
- Area code: 425
- FIPS code: 53-41470
- GNIS feature ID: 1512418

Machias is a census-designated place (CDP) in Snohomish County, Washington, United States. The population was 1,264 at the 2020 census.

Machias was laid out in 1888, and named after Machias, Maine, the ancestral home of a first settler. A post office called Machias was established in 1892, and remained in operation until 1943.

== History ==
Charles Niemeyer established a homestead along the Pilchuck River in 1877. The Seattle, Lake Shore and Eastern Railway was granted right-of-way across the property in 1888. Niemeyer later sold 80 acres (32 ha) to L. W. Getchell, who filed a plat in 1890 for Machias, named for his hometown of Machias, Maine. The townsite already had a post office and a general store; Machias later gained a church, two hotels, and several other businesses. A two-room schoolhouse was built in 1903. The town was surrounded by lumber and shingle mills; it was mostly destroyed in a 1914 fire.

== Geography ==
Machias is located at 47°59′51″N 122°2′50″W (47.997610, -122.047196).

According to the United States Census Bureau, the CDP has a total area of 2.3 mi^{2} (5.9 km^{2}), all land.

== Demographics ==
Historical population
Census	Pop.	Note	%±
2000	1,015		—
2010	1,178		16.1%
2020	1,264		7.3%
U.S. Decennial Census; 1970 1980 1990; 2000 2010

Machias first appeared as a census designated place in the 2000 U.S. census.

=== Racial and ethnic composition ===
Machias CDP, Washington – Racial and ethnic composition Note: the US Census treats Hispanic/Latino as an ethnic category. This table excludes Latinos from the racial categories and assigns them to a separate category. Hispanics/Latinos may be of any race.
Race / Ethnicity (NH = Non-Hispanic)	Pop 2000	Pop 2010	Pop 2020	% 2000	% 2010	% 2020
White alone (NH)	957	1,069	1,089	94.29%	90.75%	86.16%
Black or African American alone (NH)	10	2	5	0.99%	0.17%	0.40%
Native American or Alaska Native alone (NH)	2	13	8	0.20%	1.10%	0.63%
Asian alone (NH)	3	29	19	0.30%	2.46%	1.50%
Native Hawaiian or Pacific Islander alone (NH)	0	0	2	0.00%	0.00%	0.16%
Other race alone (NH)	3	0	7	0.30%	0.00%	0.55%
Mixed race or Multiracial (NH)	19	30	66	1.87%	2.55%	5.22%
Hispanic or Latino (any race)	21	35	68	2.07%	2.97%	5.38%
Total	1,015	1,178	1,264	100.00%	100.00%	100.00%

=== 2000 census ===
As of the 2000 census, there were 1,015 people, 344 households, and 267 families residing in the CDP. The population density was 448.1 people per square mile (172.6/km^{2}). There were 362 housing units at an average density of 159.8/sq mi (61.6/km^{2}). The racial makeup of the CDP was 95.47% White, 0.99% African American, 0.20% Native American, 0.30% Asian, 1.08% from other races, and 1.97% from two or more races. Hispanic or Latino of any race were 2.07% of the population.

There were 344 households, out of which 43.3% had children under the age of 18 living with them, 68.6% were married couples living together, 4.9% had a female householder with no husband present, and 22.1% were non-families. 14.8% of all households were made up of individuals, and 2.9% had someone living alone who was 65 years of age or older. The average household size was 2.95, and the average family size was 3.29.

In the CDP, the age distribution of the population shows 32.0% under the age of 18, 6.4% from 18 to 24, 33.2% from 25 to 44, 21.9% from 45 to 64, and 6.5% who were 65 years of age or older. The median age was 35 years. For every 100 females, there were 112.3 males. For every 100 females age 18 and over, there were 111.0 males.

The median income for a household in the CDP was $75,000, and the median income for a family was $79,112. Males had a median income of $47,941 versus $34,375 for females. The per capita income for the CDP was $27,961. About 2.1% of families and 3.5% of the population were below the poverty line, including 6.8% of those under age 18 and none of those age 65 or over.
