= Curt Marsh =

American football player (born 1959)

No. 60
- Position: Offensive tackle

Personal information
- Born: August 25, 1959 (age 67); Tacoma, Washington, U.S.
- Listed height: 6 ft 5 in (1.96 m)
- Listed weight: 273 lb (124 kg)

Career information
- High school: Snohomish (WA)
- College: Washington
- NFL draft: 1981: 1st round, 23rd overall pick

Career history
- Oakland/Los Angeles Raiders (1981–1987)

Awards and highlights
- Super Bowl champion (XVIII); PFWA All-Rookie Team (1981)

Career NFL statistics
- Games played: 45
- Games started: 29
- Fumble recoveries: 1
- Stats at Pro Football Reference

Curt Marsh (born August 25, 1959) is an American former professional football player who was an offensive tackle in the National Football League (NFL). He was selected 23rd overall in the first round by the Oakland Raiders out of the University of Washington in the 1981 NFL draft. Marsh was a High School All-American at Snohomish High School in Snohomish, Washington. Marsh played for the Raiders through 1987. He underwent more than 20 surgeries for football-related injuries, including a foot amputation, which he attributes to inadequate medical care.
