= Glacier Peak High School =

Public school in Washington, United States

Coordinates: 47°52′05″N 122°08′00″W

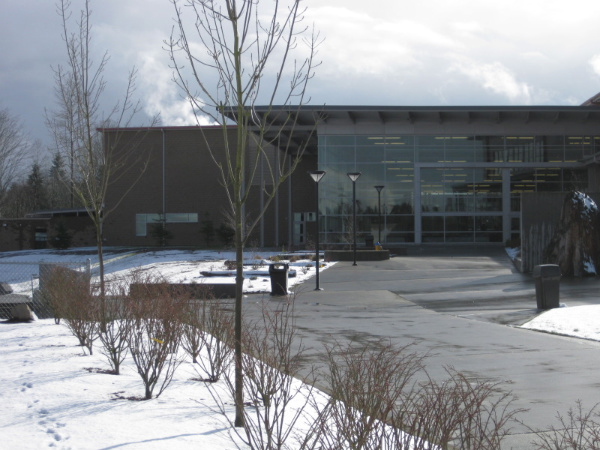
- 7401 144th Place Southeast; Snohomish, Washington 98296; United States

Information
- Type: Public
- Established: c. 2008
- School district: Snohomish School District #201
- Principal: Dr. Alicia Mitchell (2025-present); Brenda Conrad (2022-2025); Jeff Larson (2017-2022); Jim Dean (2008-2017)
- Faculty: Lance Peters, Holly Appelgate, and Brittany Elliott (Asst. Principals), Jordan Frost (Athletic Director), and Teri Corwin (ASB Advisor)
- Teaching staff: 65.50 (FTE)
- Grades: 9-12
- Gender: Coeducational
- Enrollment: 1,642 (2025-2026)
- Capacity: 1,500
- Student to teacher ratio: 25.07
- Campus size: 65 acres
- Campus type: Suburban
- Colors: Silver, Navy & White
- Athletics conference: Wesco 4A
- Mascot: Grizzly Bears
- Team name: Grizzlies
- Rival: Henry M. Jackson High School; Snohomish High School
- Newspaper: All the Edge
- Yearbook: The Edge
- Feeder schools: Totem Falls Elementary, Seattle Hill Elementary, Little Cedars Elementary, Cathcart Elementary, and Valley View Middle School
- Alumni: Amy-Eloise Markovc, long-distance runner Ve'ondre Mitchell, internet celebrity and recording artist Matt King, freestyle relay swimmer
- Information: (360) 563-7500
- Website: gphs.sno.wednet.edu

Glacier Peak High School is a public high school in Snohomish, Washington, United States, operated by the Snohomish School District, alongside Snohomish High School. Glacier Peak opened in 2008 to relieve overcrowding at Snohomish High School. It is a 230,000-square-foot (21,000 m^{2}) facility designed by NAC Architecture and built by Lydig Construction.

The site is adjacent to the former Cathcart Landfill, which opened in 1980 and closed in 1992 after reaching capacity. The high school was built on supplemental land that had been reserved for a future expansion but was later sold to the Snohomish School District. The site has a view of Glacier Peak in eastern Snohomish County.

The school opened in an almost completed state on September 3, 2008, for grades 9–11. It was completely finished by January 2009. Grades 9-12 have attended Glacier Peak since September 2009, and the first senior class graduated on June 17, 2010.

Its name was decided by a naming committee from names submitted by community members. The three names that were in the final vote were Eagle Ridge, Glacier Peak and Three Rivers. The mascot and colors were voted on by students from the Snohomish Freshman Campus and Valley View Middle School.

Glacier Peak has a large arts department; students can choose from performing and fine arts classes. A performing arts center provides a venue for Glacier Peak's performances, including plays and musicals as well as jazz band, concert band, and choir concerts.

== Academics ==
Glacier Peak offers an array of academic programs, including College in the High School, Running Start, classes at the Sno-Isle TECH Skills Center, & 19 Advanced Placement classes:

- AP 2D Art and Design / AP 3D Art and Design / AP Drawing
- AP Biology
- AP Calculus AB
- AP Calculus BC
- AP Chemistry
- AP Comparative Government
- AP Computer Science A
- AP Computer Science Principles
- AP English Language and Composition
- AP English Literature and Composition
- AP Microeconomics /
  AP Macroeconomics
- AP Physics 1
- AP Statistics
- AP US Government and Politics
- AP US History
- AP World History

== Extracurriculars ==
=== Sports and athletics ===
Glacier Peak competes as a member of the WESCO 4A league, which operates under the WIAA Northwest District 1 in Washington state.

It offers a wide range of sports, including football / flag football, cross country, volleyball, tennis, soccer, swim & dive, wrestling, basketball, gymnastics, unified sports, baseball / softball, track and field, golf, and badminton.

The boys soccer team won the state championship in 2010 and the girls cross country team won the state championships in 2010, 2012, 2013, 2015, & 2018.

=== Clubs ===
Glacier Peak offers a total of 43 clubs:

- Art
- ASB/Leadership
- Black Student Union
- Book
- Cheerleading
- Chinese
- Choir
- Club America
- Cultural Collective
- Dance Team
- DECA
- Debate
- E-Sports
- FCCLA
- FFA Vet Science
- Finance
- Game
- German
- Green
- Grizzly Cubs
- HOSA
- Ignite 2 Unite
- Impact
- Indian Student Association
- JROTC
- Key
- Knowledge Bowl
- K-Pop
- Latinos Unidos
- Link Crew
- Marching/Pep Band
- Math Olympiad
- Model UN
- National Honor Society
- One Voice
- RAKE
- Robotics
- Science Research
- SkillsUSA
- STEM/CADD
- Strings
- Student Media
- Theatre

=== Robotics ===
Founded in 2008, The Sonic Squirrels FIRST Robotics Competition Team 2930 is composed of Glacier Peak and Snohomish High School students, representing the Snohomish School District. Initially known as "Roboshi" and then the "TaterBotz", they rebranded in 2014 to become what we know today, the Sonic Squirrels.

The Sonic Squirrels won the Pacific Northwest FIRST District Championships in 2015 and 2025. They have also won multiple awards throughout the years.

=== Band ===
Glacier Peak boasts three concert bands: Concert Band (freshman), Symphonic Band (sophomores-seniors), and Wind Ensemble (audition only). There is also a percussion ensemble and the Grizzly Marching/Pep Band for sports events, as well as two jazz bands. Jazz I is audition only and Jazz II is open to all. Tadd Morris directs the bands at Glacier Peak and Joel Orsen directs Jazz II.

=== Choir ===
Glacier Peak has two choirs directed by Nancy Lamont: Concert Choir and Symphonic Choir (audition only).

== Incidents ==
On February 13, 2015, an unknown person intentionally set fire to a dugout in the girls’ fastpitch softball field, followed by a second dugout on February 15, 2015. Some of the equipment used by the softball team was also burned and the estimated damage cost was $30,000-40,000. School was not in session these days and no one was harmed. The dugouts were rebuilt and finished by March 31, 2015, just in time for the softball season.

On June 10, 2018, just before noon, an 18-year-old man crashed his truck through the front doors of Glacier Peak, causing significant structural damages to the main entrance. The man was transported to a local hospital for evaluation and subsequently arrested for first-degree DUI. No one was hurt since the incident occurred on a Sunday. It did not affect anything, including graduation, for the last week of school.

On November 29, 2018, two students created derogatory Wi-Fi names during the winter pep assembly. After students reported the network names to the staff, the principal canceled the remainder of the assembly and sent students back to class. The two students were disciplined, but their punishment was not disclosed due to federal student privacy laws. This incident resulted in the creation of the Black Student Union club.

On April 15, 2026, students were briefly exposed to inappropriate images during a classroom slideshow. The incident involved images of nude breasts appearing as small preview boxes within a folder on a slide. The school administration stated that the content did not meet classroom expectations and that steps were being taken to address the situation. The teacher resigned shortly after.

On April 16, 2026, at approximately 6:30 pm, a fire broke out in the shop classroom. A wastebasket by the door to the shop burned down to the ground and was quickly extinguished by sprinklers. The cause of the fire was "unable to be determined" according to the Snohomish Regional Fire Department. No one was injured and it wasn't suspected to be arson. The shop closed for the rest of the school year due to smoke and water damage.

There have also been multiple bomb threats made over the years but none of them have resulted in actual bombs on campus.

== Fight song ==
Grizzlies fight for our dear Glacier Peak
For our alma mater cheer!
Let’s hear for the mighty Grizzly team
For victory is near!
All across the valley hear us shout
We will reign fore’er beyond all doubt!
So fight, fight, fight for the blue and white
And onward to victory!
