= S43 =

S43 may refer to:

== Submarines ==
- HMS Unicorn (S43), of the Royal Navy
- INS Vagsheer (S43), of the Indian Navy
- USS S-43 (SS-154), of the United States Navy

== Other uses ==
- County Route 563 (New Jersey), designated New Jersey Route S43 until 1953
- County Route S43 (Bergen County, New Jersey)
- Harvey Airfield, in Snohomish, Washington, United States
- Sikorsky S-43, an American flying boat
- Sulfur-43, an isotope of sulfur
- S43, a postcode district in Chesterfield, England
