= Edson T. Cady =

Edson T. Cady was an early European-American settler in the Pacific Northwest. Along with Emory C. Ferguson, he co-founded the town of Cadyville, Washington in 1860 to take advantage of a military road Congress planned that never materialized. Cadyville was renamed to Snohomish in 1871.

Cady sailed from New York on the Nautilus on February 22, 1849, headed for California. According to the 1862 Census of Snohomish County, Cady was 34 years old and a native of Utica, New York. The 1862 census listed his name as "E.F. Cady".

Cady Creek and Cady Pass, located in the Henry M. Jackson Wilderness, were named after the 1860 Cady exploring party. The party was attempting to locate a railroad route over the North Cascades.
