= Snohomish School District =

School district in Washington, United States

The Snohomish School District is the school district serving the city of Snohomish, Washington, United States. It covers a population of 58,300 within an area of 128 square miles (330 km^{2}). The district has a total enrollment of 9681 students and 350 employees. It also has a 4-year graduation rate of 91.0%. Its superintendent is Kent Kultgen. Snohomish School District is a member of ESD #189.

== Schools ==
=== Elementary schools ===
- Cascade View Elementary
- Cathcart Elementary
- Central Primary Center
- Dutch Hill Elementary
- Emerson Elementary
- Little Cedars Elementary (opened fall 2007)
- Machias Elementary
- Riverview Elementary (opened 2011)
- Seattle Hill Elementary
- Totem Falls Elementary

=== Middle schools ===
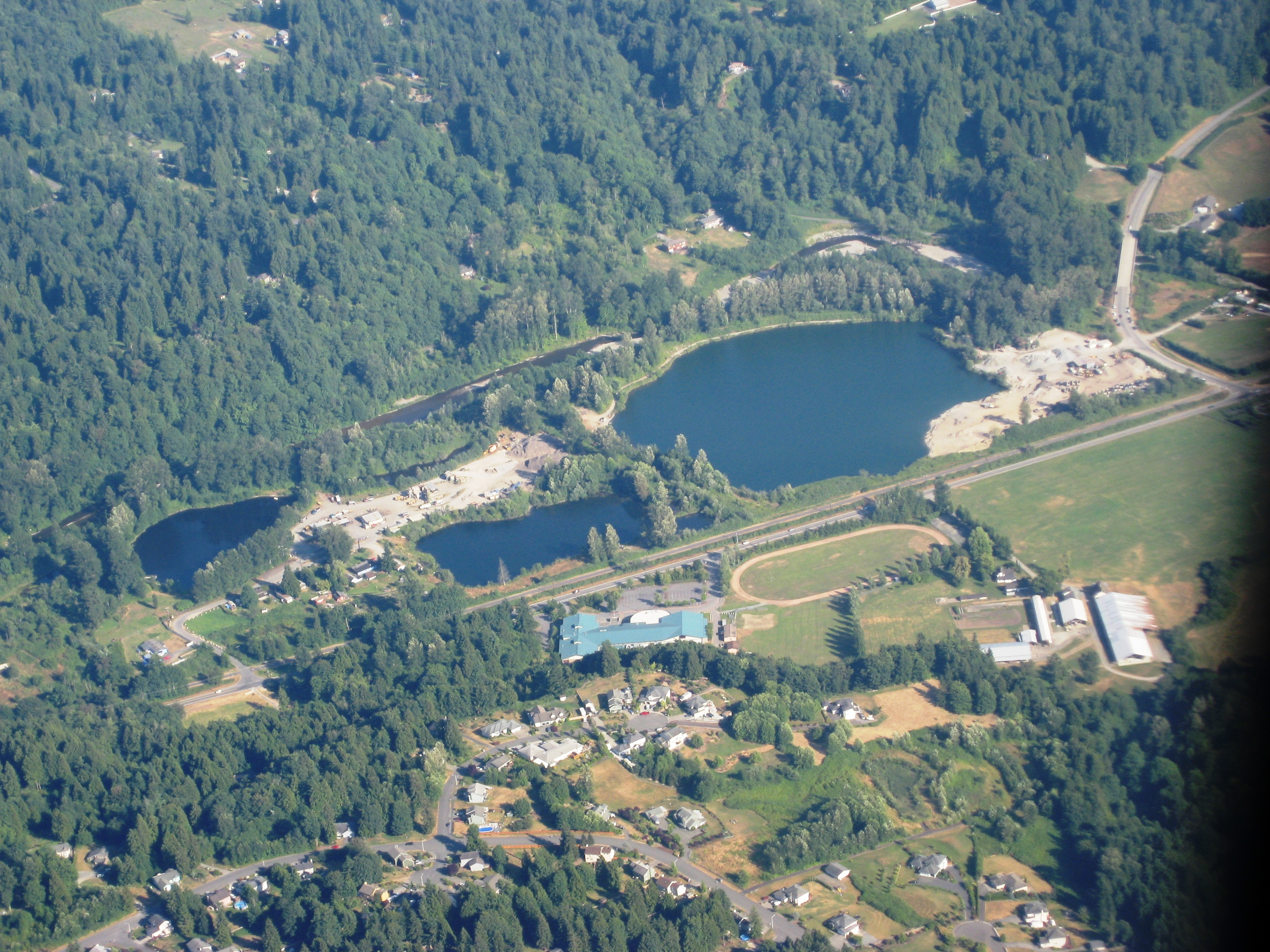
Aerial photo of Centennial Middle School

- Centennial Middle School
- Valley View Middle School

==== Athletics ====
Once each year, the football teams of the middle schools meet in a game called "The Chili Bowl." This name is derived from a tradition that the losing team serves chili to the winning team.

=== High schools ===
- Glacier Peak High School (opened fall 2008)
- Snohomish Senior High School

=== Alternative schools ===
- AIM High School
- Alternative Learning Center
- Parent Partnership Program

== New school ==
In the spring of 2004 a bond election was successfully passed, approving the necessary funding for a new high school. The school was to be sited on Cathcart Way, and completion was scheduled for September 2008.

The Seattle Times noted that "the projected cost of [the] new Snohomish-district high school has risen from $68 million to $76 million, [and] the estimated cost of a major renovation to Snohomish High School has climbed from $64 million to $71 million."

According to the Everett Herald, the new school project could receive up to 16.2 million dollars in state grants, as approved by the state superintendent's office in 2006.

The district also built an elementary school, Little Cedars Elementary, which opened in fall 2007.

The new high school was named "Glacier Peak High School" by the committee on the end of May. Its colors are white, blue, and silver. The mascot is a Grizzly Bear.

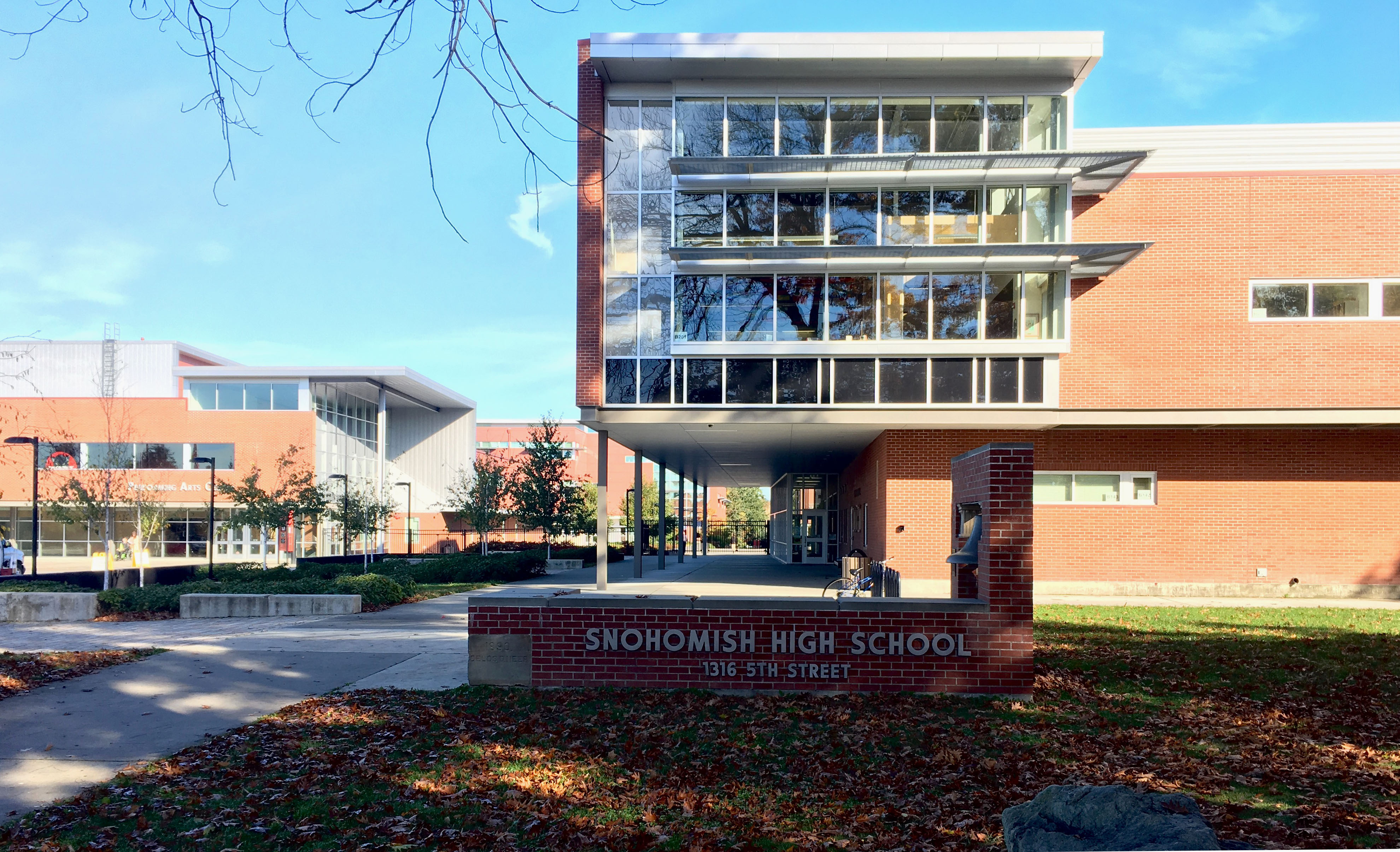
Historic Snohomish High School

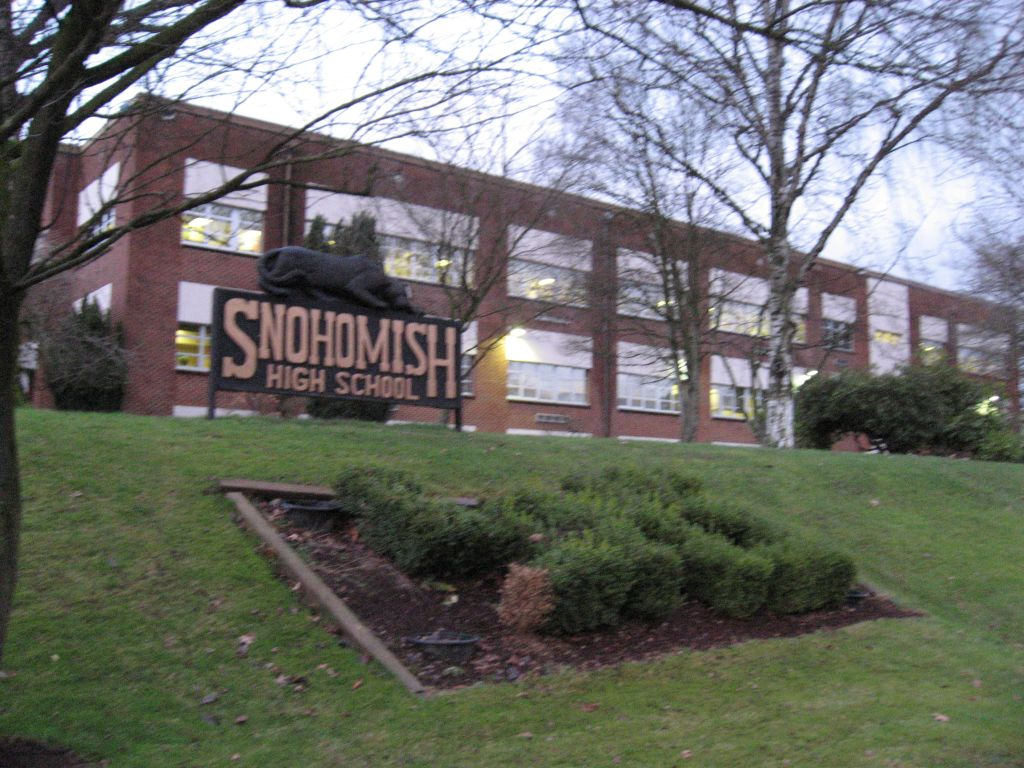
Snohomish High School

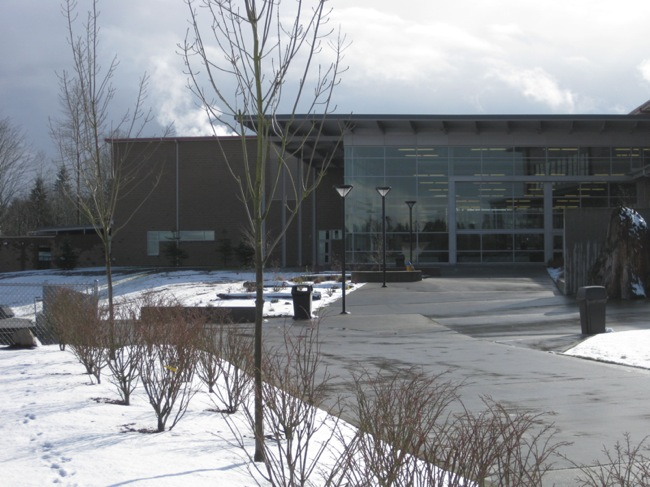
New High School in recent edition to Snohomish School District Borders
