= Emory C. Ferguson =

American politician

Emory Canda Ferguson
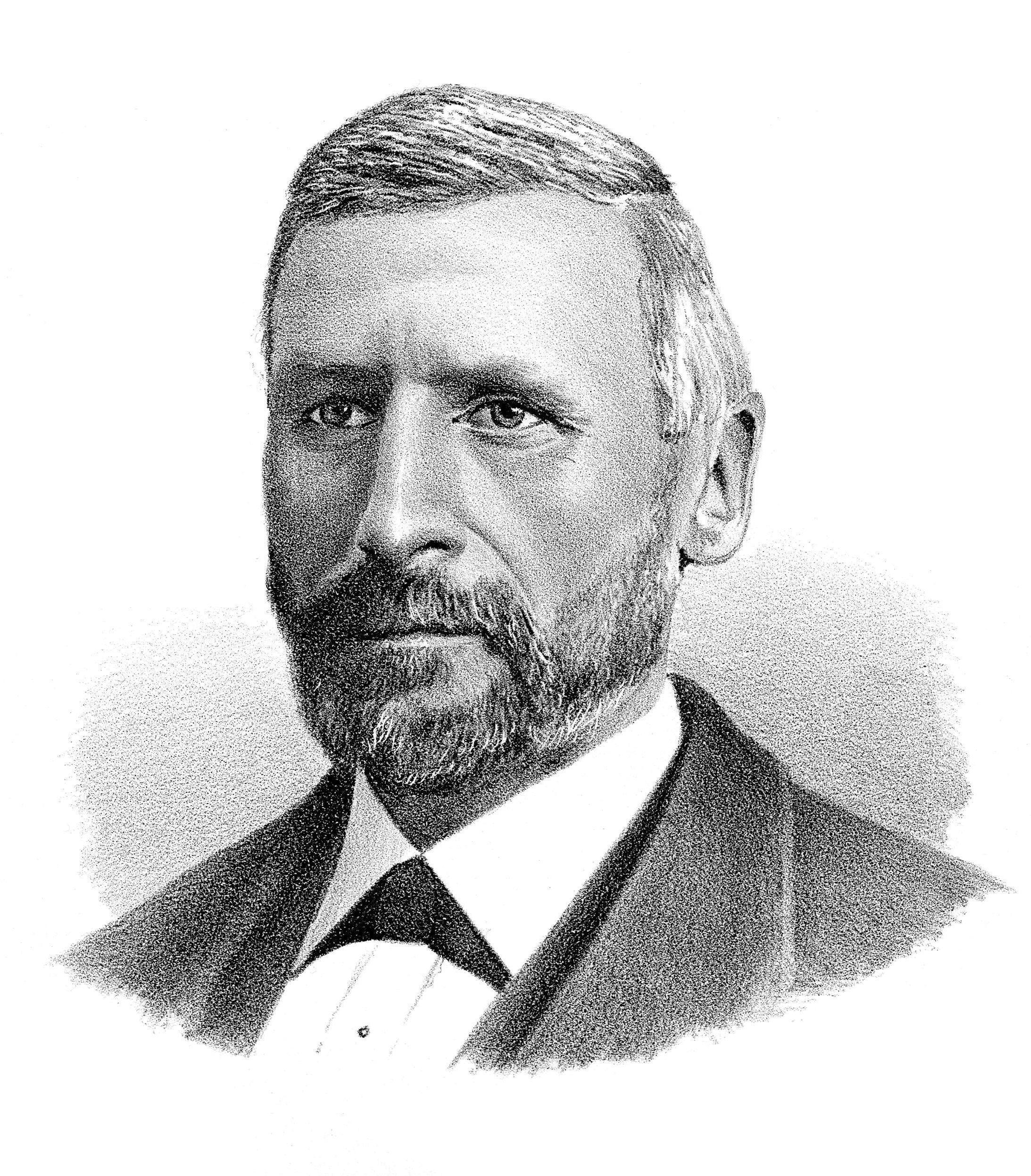
- Portrait of Emory C. Ferguson
- Born: March 5, 1833; Westchester County, New York, United States
- Died: October 7, 1911 (aged 78)
- Resting place: Grand Army of the Republic Cemetery, Snohomish, Washington, United States.
- Known for: Snohomish County pioneer, co-founder of Snohomish, Washington
- Spouse: Lucetta Morgan
- Children: Sylvia Ferguson, Ethel Ferguson, Ivie Feruson, and Emory Ceci Ferguson
- Parent(s): Samuel and Maria Ferguson

Signature
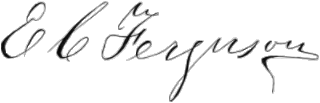

Emory Canda Ferguson (March 5, 1833 – October 7, 1911) was an early pioneer of Washington state who helped create Snohomish County from Island County in 1861. Along with Edson F. Cady, he was a founder of Snohomish, which would become the county seat from 1862 until 1896. Over his life, Ferguson served as county commissioner, postmaster, a Washington state legislator, Speaker of the State House of Representatives, Snohomish City Council President, justice of the peace, and mayor of Snohomish, as well as realtor, saloon keeper, and store owner. He was involved in many early plans to make Snohomish prominent, including a ferry for military use across the Snohomish River and a trail through the Cascade Mountains to reach a gold rush, few of which were successful. Upon his death, Ferguson was eulogized as the "Father of Snohomish."

== Early life ==
Ferguson was born in Westchester County, New York on March 5, 1833. He was the fourth child of Samuel and Maria Ferguson. His father was a farmer and former paper maker of Scottish descent. The Ferguson family were among the first families to settle the region between the Connecticut border and the Hudson River. At age 16, Emory served an apprenticeship with a carpenter. In five years he completed his apprenticeship and began work as a journeyman. However, just one month after his 21st birthday, he left for California to join the California Gold Rush.

== Searches for gold ==
Ferguson elected to travel to San Francisco via the Isthmus of Panama, a quick but harrowing route. He arrived on May 4, 1854, and initially searched for gold along with the majority of participants in the gold rush. However, by 1856 Ferguson was operating a general store located near the original Sutter strike. He soon left the business behind to run a sawmill located in Greenwood Valley, El Dorado County. He would soon leave this endeavor as well, leaving in 1858 for the Fraser River during the Fraser River gold rush. He took a steamer north to Puget Sound, followed by a stop in Whatcom to prepare for the final portion of his journey to British Columbia, departing Whatcom on July 12, 1858. This trip was ultimately fruitless, and Ferguson headed south to Seattle and then Steilacoom in search of employment.

== Washington ==
In Steilacoom, Ferguson found employment in carpentry. While in Steilacoom, Ferguson along with Edson Cady, Egbert H. Tucker, and Hiel Barnes decided to head north and settle land around the Snohomish River with the goal of establishing a ferry and road for future military use. In March 1860 Ferguson arrived at Cadyville, the town having been established by and named after Edson Cady. He brought with him a home he built in Steilacoom and shipped north as well as goods to start a store. Ferguson made a homestead claim of 160 acres of land along the river. During a short-lived gold rush in Okanogan County, Ferguson sold subscriptions to establish a trail from Cadyville to the site. Construction started in May 1860, but the rush did last and the trail was abandoned after. Ferguson returned to the Snohomish.

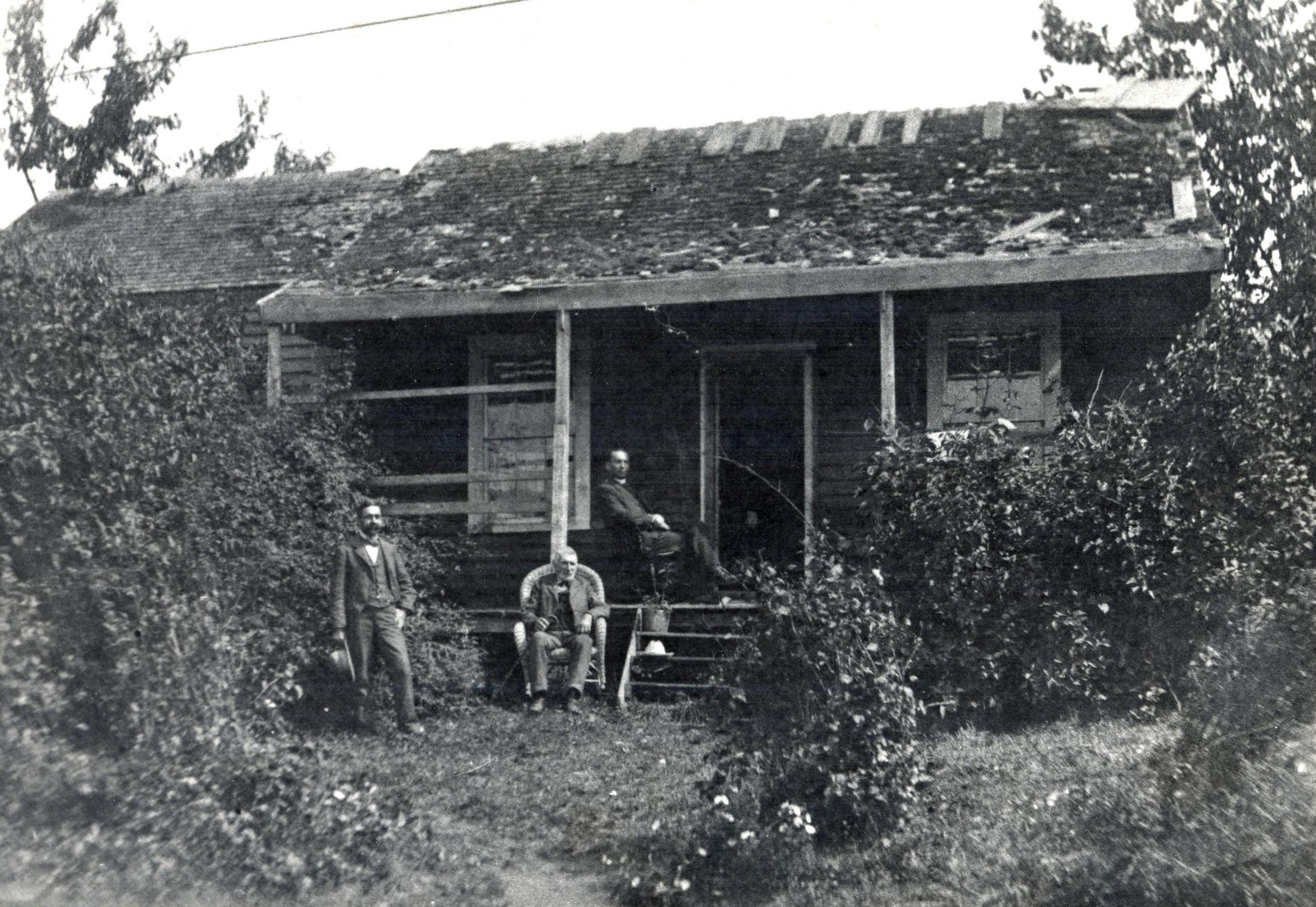
Ferguson's cottage, c. 1902. Ferguson is seen seated, second from the left.

In late 1860, Ferguson was instrumental in the creation of Snohomish County. The region was under the control of Island County, whose county seat lay on Whidbey Island. Communication with the county seat was difficult due to limited infrastructure in the region, and after a settler by the name of T. P. Carter was killed by local natives desire for closer governance ran high. A vote was taken. Seventeen ballots were cast, Ferguson's among them. The ballots were forwarded to the Island County seat of Coupeville. There is no record that these votes were ever received or counted, and ultimately nothing was done. Following the unsuccessful vote, a group of twenty citizens rallied under the leadership of Ferguson. Efforts were made to organize a petition to send to Olympia, but before it could even be assembled the territorial legislature moved to grant Snohomish County its independence. An act was passed on January 14, 1861 creating Snohomish County from Island County. The act also named Ferguson as one of three county commissioners. Ferguson personally stored county records in his small home.

During the first meeting of county commissioners, on which Ferguson sat as chairman, Ferguson was named justice for the Snohomish precinct. A post office was soon established with Ferguson taking on the responsibility of being postmaster. His salary as postmaster, as well as the expense of carrying mail to its destination came out of the income of the office. He handled approximately three letters a month, so to save money Ferguson arranged a deal with the post office in Mukilteo. Whoever happened to be heading up the Snohomish River would bring Ferguson mail, and whoever happened to be heading downstream would deliver mail to the Mukilteo office and on to its destination. Because of this frugal if not timely practice, Ferguson achieved a surplus of 27 cents at the end of the quarter and remitted it to Washington, D.C. Thereafter the government decided to cover the expense of moving mail from Mukileo and Snohomish.

In 1864 Ferguson opened the Blue Eagle saloon after being licensed to operate the establishment. Having little time to actively wait as bartender, so he simply put change in the register and prominently displayed the price list for drinks. Ferguson would later claim to have never lost a dime operating this way. In February 1871, he had completed the requirements of his homestead and filed to officially form Snohomish the following June. Over the next two decades, Ferguson would take on further responsibilities in addition to being postmaster, including state legislator, Speaker of the State House of Representatives, and Snohomish City Council President as well as mayor of Snohomish. His late years were devoted to private business.

Ferguson died on October 7, 1911, and is buried in the Grand Army of the Republic Cemetery in Snohomish, Washington.

== Personal life ==
Before meeting his future wife, Ferguson lived with an Indian woman who gave birth to a girl. While serving on the state legislature in Olympia, Washington, Ferguson met Lucretia Morgan. In 1868 they married. Following the marriage, Ferguson transferred the ownership of the Blue Eagle Saloon to his brother and assumed the life of a family man. With Lucretia, Ferguson would have four children named Ivie, Ethel, Sylvia, and Emory Cecil.
