= Everett–Snohomish Interurban =

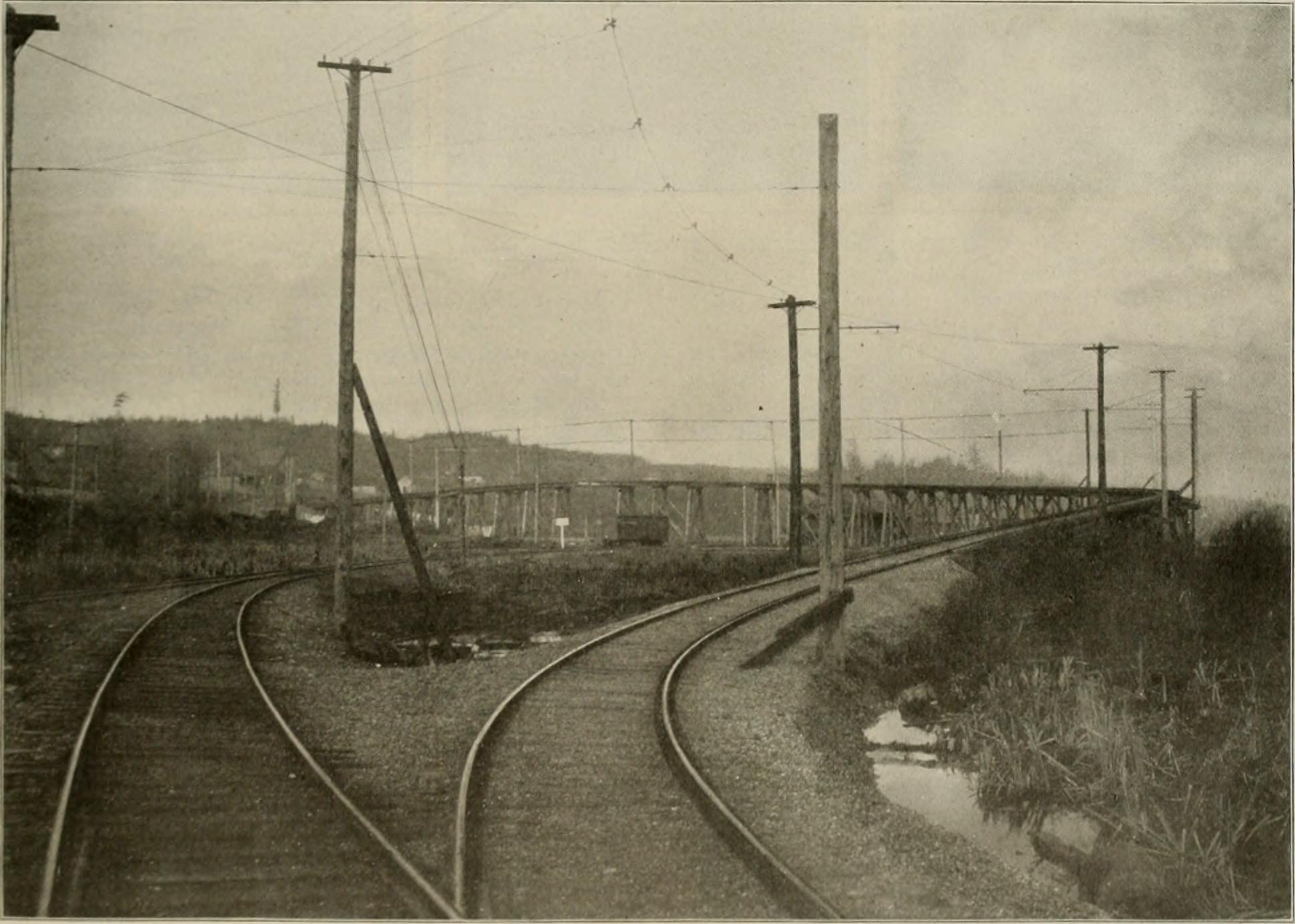
- Junction of the steam and electric lines and trestle over the Northern & Pacific tracks

Overview
- Headquarters: Everett
- Locale: Everett–Snohomish, Washington
- Dates of operation: 1903–1921

Technical
- Track gauge: 1,435 mm (4 ft 8 1/2 in) standard gauge
- Length: 9 miles (14 km)

The Everett–Snohomish Interurban was a 9-mile (14 km) long interurban electric railroad between Everett and Snohomish, Washington. It was inaugurated by the Everett Railway & Electric Co. of Everett, on December 1, 1903.

== Lease ==
The electric cars replaced steam trains on the track formerly used by the Northern Pacific Railway for its local trains, as a branch of its trans-continental system. The Electric Company has negotiated a lease of the track from the Northern Pacific for a term of several years, undertaking to make connections with all Northern Pacific trains at Snohomish, and handle all its passenger, regular baggage and express business between Everett and Snohomish. Transcontinental passengers, baggage and express over the Northern Pacific were handled by the Electric company between Everett and Snohomish, using Electric company pasters on all through tickets.

== Stations ==
The interurban served two terminals at Everett and Snohomish and six intermediate stops in various towns and neighborhoods. Each stop had an estimated population of about 200 people.

== Electrification ==
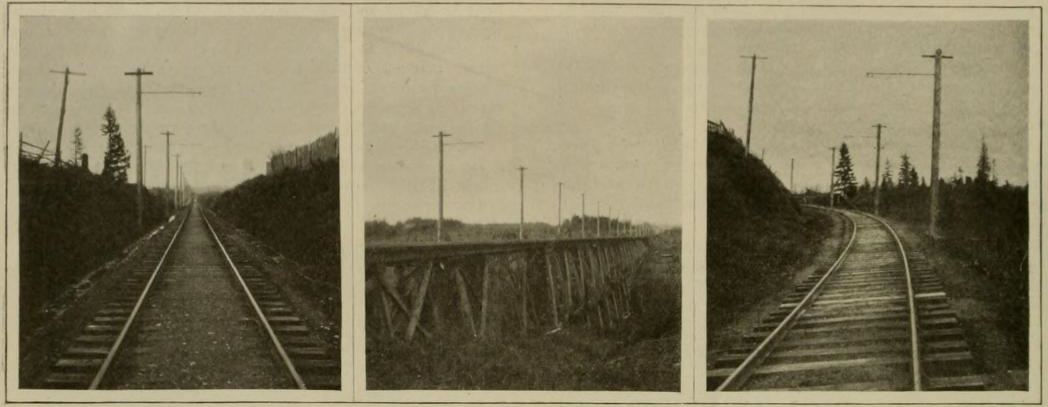
Straight track and pole construction, double deck trestle 70 feet (21 m) high and typical curve and overhead work

The overhead trolley system consisted of No. 0000 Fig. 8 trolley wire supported every 110 feet (34 m) by flexible brackets on side pole construction. The Ohio Brass Co's. material was used exclusively for trolley construction. The 38–45 feet (12–14 m) long poles were of cedar, 12 inches (300 mm) at the top, and were set 8 feet (2.4 m) in the ground and placed 6 feet 4 inches (1.93 m)from the rail. The trolley wire was 23 feet (7.0 m) from the top of the rail, on account of danger to brakemen on steam freight trains if lower construction was used. On account of the distance of the poles from the track, a 10 feet (3.0 m) bracket was used.

A 350,000 c.m. (177 mm²) feeder cable was used to within a mile (1.6 km) of the end of the line, taps being made every 1,000 feet (300 m), while another 350,000 c.m. (177 mm²) cable was used to a point 3 miles (4.8 km) from the power house, at the point of heaviest grade.

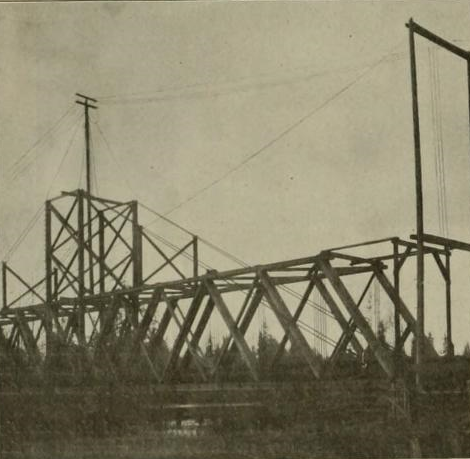
Drawbridge with pivot pole for overhead lines

Two draw bridges were crossed by this railroad, necessitating a pivot pole in the center of the draw span carrying the trolley, feeder, and return current cables up over this pole high enough to allow the passage of vessels up the river. Taps are made off of these cables at the pivot pole to the trolley and track on the bridge.

The entire construction of this railroad had to be done, while the Northern Pacific was operating an average of ten steam trains a day over it, making the work extremely difficult and hazardous. On account of the danger involved and the novel construction, the work was done under the personal supervision of the company's general superintendent, Mr. R. P. Stevens.

The track was bonded with Ohio Brass Co's. flexible No. 0000 bonds, with compressed terminals, which were expanded into 7/8 inch (22 mm) holes in the rails. This bond was 12 inches (300 mm) long and placed under the angle bars. No. 0000 cross bonds of the same type were used every 1,000 feet (300 m).

Power for the operation of this railroad was furnished from the Everett power house of the Everett Railway & Electric Co., about 10 miles (16 km) from the further end of the line, and 1 mile (1.6 km) from the Everett terminal.

== Rolling stock ==
The rolling stock used on this line consisted of two passenger cars and one combination passenger and baggage car. The passenger cars were 43 feet (13 m) long and 8 feet 4 inches (2.54 m) wide. They provided seats for 48 people. The slightly longer combination cars were overall 43 feet 8 inches (13.31 m) long and 8 feet 4 inches (2.54 m) wide. It seated 40 people and had a 9 feet (2.7 m) long baggage compartment.

The cars had cross seats, and windows with double sash, the upper sash being stationary and the lower sash dropping down. They were heated with the Consolidated Car Heater Co's eight-heater equipments and were mounted on Brill No. 27-E-1 trucks with 5 inches (130 mm) and 33 inches (840 mm) spoke wheels, made by St. Louis Car Co. Westinghouse No. 68 motors, four to a car, hung inside. Westinghouse K-6 controllers, and Westinghouse air brakes were used on all three cars.

== Operation ==
The operation laid under telegraphic train orders from the chief dispatcher of the Northern Pacific at Seattle, the card system being used on this block on account of the frequency of the service, and the Northern Pacific still operating its freight trains on this line.

The fare from Everett to Snohomish one way was 25 cents. Round trip tickets were sold for 40 cents, including transfer from or to any part of the city. Tickets were sold at stations at each end of the line and on the cars, cash fare receipts being given by the conductors. Five cents were charged between any two stations.

== Closure ==
The interurban's trestle between Lowell and Snohomish was destroyed during a major flood in December 1921. The interurban was not rebuilt and soon abandoned. A 1/3-mile (0.54 km) section of the interurban's right of way in northern Snohomish is preserved as a gravel pedestrian trail.
