= Snohomish, Washington =

Snohomish
- City
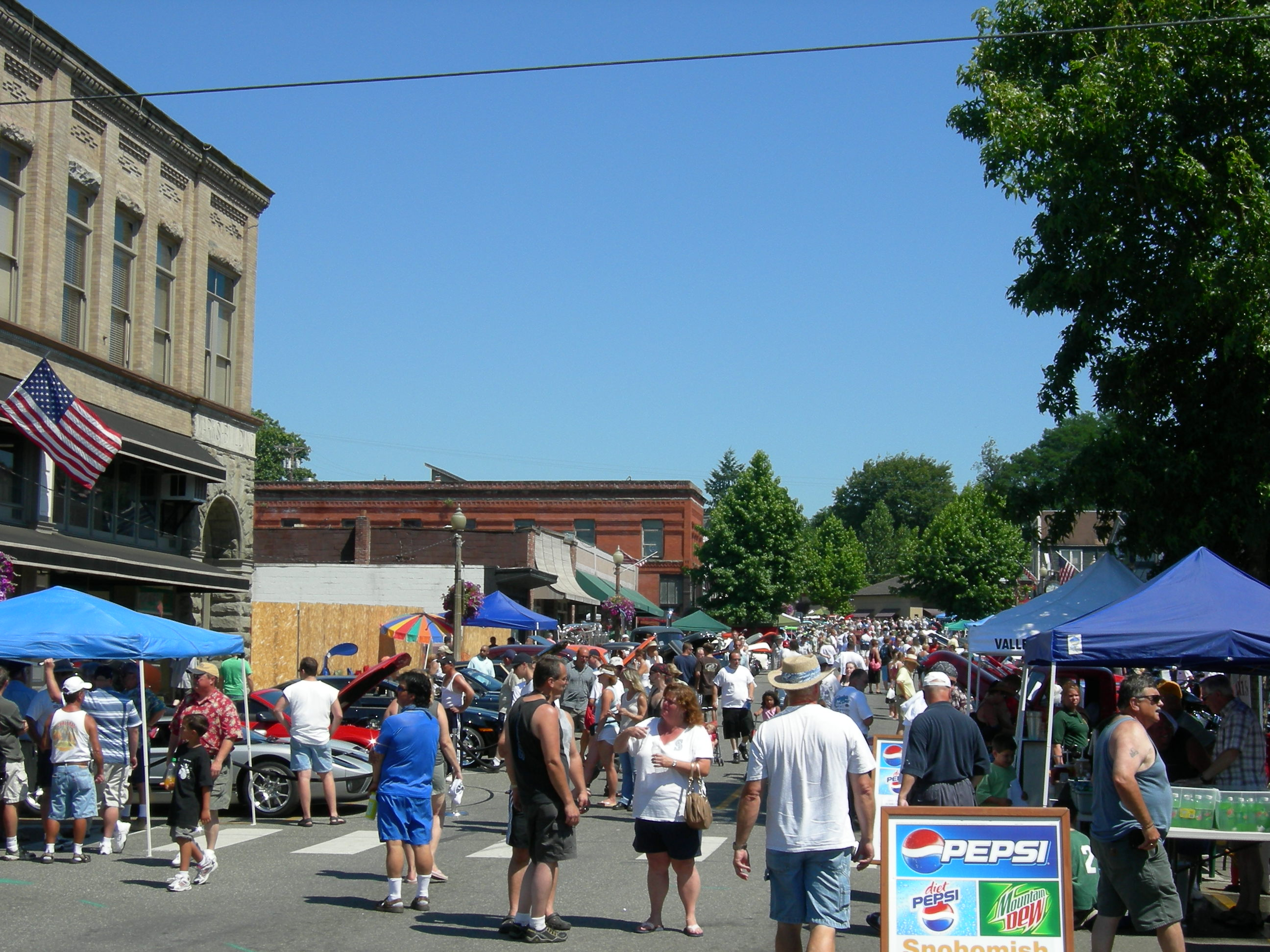
- First Street during the annual Kla-Ha-Ya Days celebration, 2006
- Interactive map of Snohomish
- Coordinates: 47°55′9″N 122°5′28″W
- Country: United States
- State: Washington
- County: Snohomish
- Founded: 1859
- Incorporated: June 26, 1890

Government
  - Type: Mayor–council
  - Mayor: Aaron Hoffman
  - City administrator: Ken Klein

Area
  - Total: 3.72 sq mi (9.64 km^{2})
  - Land: 3.52 sq mi (9.12 km^{2})
  - Water: 0.20 sq mi (0.52 km^{2}) 5.37%
- Elevation: 66 ft (20 m)

Population (2020)
  - Total: 10,126
  - Estimate (2024): 10,534
  - Density: 2,876/sq mi (1,110.4/km^{2})
- Time zone: UTC−8 (PST)
  - Summer (DST): UTC−7 (PDT)
- ZIP Codes: 98290–98291, 98296
- Area code: 360, 564
- FIPS code: 53-65170
- GNIS feature ID: 1531910
- Website: www.snohomishwa.gov

Snohomish (/snoʊˈhoʊmɪʃ/) is a city in Snohomish County, Washington, United States. The population was 10,126 at the 2020 census. It is located on the Snohomish River, southeast of Everett and northwest of Monroe. Snohomish lies at the intersection of U.S. Route 2 and State Route 9. The city's airport, Harvey Airfield, is located south of downtown and used primarily for general aviation.

The city was founded in 1859 and named Cadyville after pioneer settler Edson T. Cady and renamed to Snohomish in 1871. It served as county seat of Snohomish County from 1861 to 1897, when the county government was relocated to Everett. Snohomish has a downtown district that is renowned for its collection of antique shops and is listed on the National Register of Historic Places.

== History ==
The Snohomish River Valley was originally inhabited by the Snohomish people, a Coast Salish tribe who lived between Port Gardner Bay and modern-day Monroe. An archaeological site near the confluence of the Snohomish and Pilchuck Rivers has indications of human habitation that began as early as 8,000 years before present. A village, sbadaʔɬ, was at the site of the modern-day city that now bears the tribe's name. The Snohomish had contact with white explorers in the early 19th century, with their name recorded as "Sinnahamis" by John Work of the Hudson's Bay Company, among the first to also use the name to describe the river. The Snohomish were signatories of the Point Elliott Treaty in 1855, which relocated the tribe to the Tulalip Indian Reservation.

In the early 1850s, the territorial government planned to construct a military road connecting Fort Steilacoom to Fort Bellingham, with a ferry crossing of the Snohomish River at Kwehtlamanish, a winter village of the Snohomish people. The road, proposed in the wake of the Pig War, was intended to be built far enough inland to be safe from British naval attacks. The confluence of the Snohomish and Pilchuck rivers, located near Kwehtlamanish, was sought by several American settlers from Steilacoom who arrived in 1859 to file homestead claims. Edson F. Cady and Heil Barnes, representing carpenter Emory C. Ferguson, settled near the proposed ferry landing, while Egbert H. Tucker filed a claim for a plot on the other side of the Snohomish River. The settlement was originally known as "Cadyville" and changed its name to Snohomish City in 1871. The name Snohomish comes from the name of the dominant local Native American tribe "sdoh-doh-hohbsh" ([sduhúbʃ]), whose meaning is widely disputed.

Although the military road was never completed, Snohomish quickly became a center of commerce in the expanding region. In 1861, Snohomish County separated from Island County and the Village of Snohomish was voted the county seat. The first school in the settlement was organized in 1867 or 1867. The first train on the Seattle, Lake Shore and Eastern Railway arrived in Snohomish on July 16, 1888. Snohomish was incorporated as a town in 1888 and re-incorporated as a city in 1890 after Washington had achieved statehood. The first class graduated from Snohomish High School in 1894. The city lost its status as county seat in 1897, when the government relocated to the larger, yet much newer neighboring city of Everett after a controversial and contested county-wide vote.

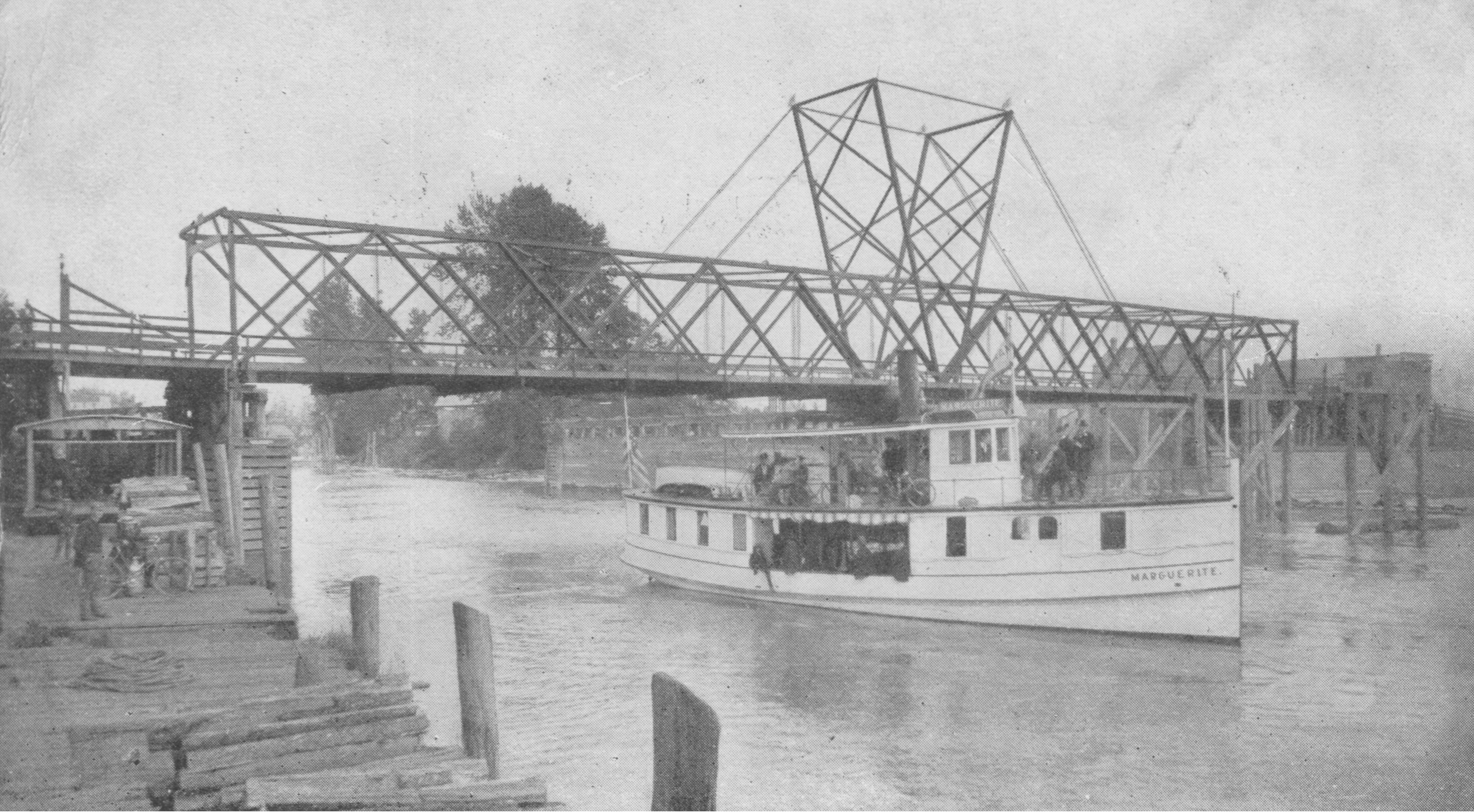
The steamboat Marguerite at Snohomish, Washington, sometime before May 24, 1907

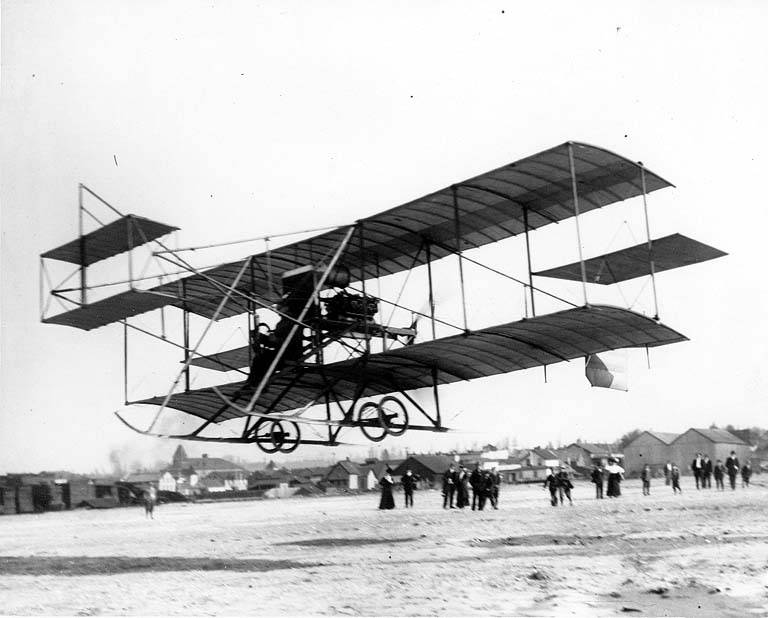
Frederick Joseph Wiseman takes off on May 7, 1911, for the first motorized flight in the county

By 1899, Snohomish had 2,000 residents, 25 businesses, and 80 homes. After First Street was paved with brick in 1903, a three-day celebration was held by residents to mark the occasion. The city's first public library was opened in 1910 with funds from industrialist Andrew Carnegie; the Snohomish Carnegie Building, the oldest public building in the city, remained in use as a library until it was replaced by a modern building at a different site in 2003.

On May 7, 1911, a memorable event took place near Snohomish, north of present-day Harvey Airfield, with the first powered flight in Snohomish County history by Fred J. Wiseman. He climbed to an altitude of approximately 18 meters in his self-built aircraft for less than a minute before landing somewhat roughly. Wiseman was the first amateur pilot and the first aircraft builder in California, and he further cemented his legacy with the first airmail flight on February 17/18 of the same year, from Petaluma to Santa Rosa.

On May 30, 1911, a major fire struck First Street and destroyed one block of buildings between Avenues B and C, affecting 35 businesses. It caused $170,000 in damage and prompted much of downtown to be rebuilt with brick. The population of Snohomish grew to over 3,000 in 1920 and remained relatively stable for the next 40 years. The city was connected to Everett by an interurban railway that ceased operations in 1921 after a trestle was damaged during a major flood.

The Great Depression was not acutely felt in Snohomish due to its primarily agrarian economy. One of the area's largest employers, the Bickford Ford car dealership, was founded in 1934 and flourished. The 1930s brought Snohomish national notice as the hometown of baseball star Earl Averill, the first Washingtonian elected to the Baseball Hall of Fame. Averill played from 1929 to 1941, mostly with the Cleveland Indians. An airport, named Harvey Airfield, was built south of downtown Snohomish by a local family and remains privately operated.

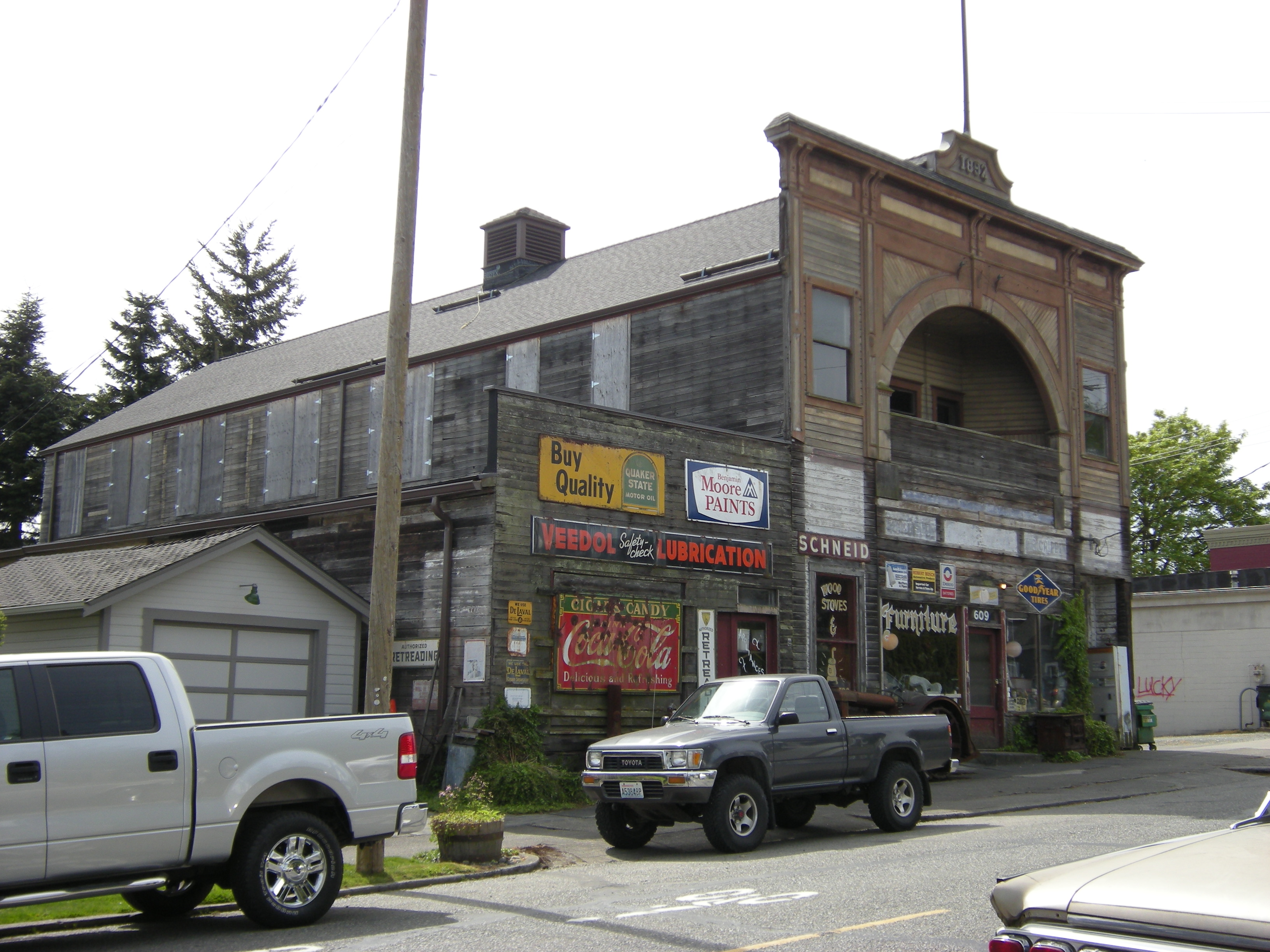
The Alcazar Opera House, built in 1892, later became an agricultural supply store and is now one of Snohomish's many antiques stores.

By the 1960s, Snohomish had entered a period of urban decay and investigated potential urban renewal plans to revitalize downtown. A plan presented in 1965 to demolish the south side of First Street and remodel existing buildings was opposed by residents and ultimately not realized due to a lack of funding. Several abandoned buildings on the south side were demolished for a riverfront park, while the city began annexing areas to the north of downtown Snohomish. In 1973, the city established a 26-block historic district and adopted design ordinances to retain historic buildings and encourage new construction in the same style. The Snohomish Historic Business District was placed on the National Register of Historic Places in 1974. Larger stores moved away from First Street into newer developments and strip malls that spread out along Second Street and Avenue D.

In 1974 the Seattle-Snohomish mill was gutted by fire and rebuilt by its owners. In 1975 a severe flood struck the area, damaging over 300 homes and killing 3,500 head of livestock, but the community rallied to support those who were affected. In 1985, U.S. Route 2 was rerouted around Snohomish on a bypass, which relieved downtown of chronic traffic congestion. In the 1990s, First Street was redeveloped to encourage tourism to the historic district. Sidewalks were rebuilt and public restrooms added, while the city hall and police station were moved away from First Street.

== Geography ==
Snohomish is located along the north bank of the Snohomish River near where it is joined by the Pilchuck River. The city lies on the Getchell Hill Plateau, a low hill in the Snohomish River Valley that interrupts the wide, flat river valley. Some neighborhoods of the city are on a ridge that is west of the Pilchuck River, as well as Dutch Hill on the opposite bank. Blackmans Lake (formerly Stillaguamish Lake) is located north of downtown Snohomish and has a boat launch maintained by the city government. The river valley was formed approximately 14,000 years before present by the outflow of a glacial lake during the Vashon Glaciation event. The river itself floods during the winter season, occasionally breaching the dikes in Downtown Snohomish.

According to the United States Census Bureau, the city has a total area of 3.60 square miles (9.32 km^{2}), of which, 3.44 square miles (8.91 km^{2}) is land and 0.16 square miles (0.41 km^{2}) is water. Snohomish's city limits are generally defined by the Snohomish River to the south, Fobes Hill to the west, several city streets to the north, and the Pilchuck River to the east. The city also has an urban growth area that extends north towards U.S. Route 2 and south of the Snohomish River to include Harvey Airfield.

The historic business and residential center of the town constitutes the Snohomish Historic District, which is listed on the National Register of Historic Places. Many houses bear plaques with the year the house was built and the name of the people who originally occupied it. Each year the city gives tours of the historic houses; one of them, the Blackman House, is a year-round museum.

== Demographics ==
Historical population
Census	Pop.	Note	%±
1880	149		—
1890	1,903		1,177.2%
1900	2,101		10.4%
1910	3,244		54.4%
1920	2,985		−8.0%
1930	2,688		−9.9%
1940	2,794		3.9%
1950	3,094		10.7%
1960	3,894		25.9%
1970	5,174		32.9%
1980	5,294		2.3%
1990	6,499		22.8%
2000	8,494		30.7%
2010	9,098		7.1%
2020	10,126		11.3%
2022 (est.)	10,534		4.0%
U.S. Decennial Census

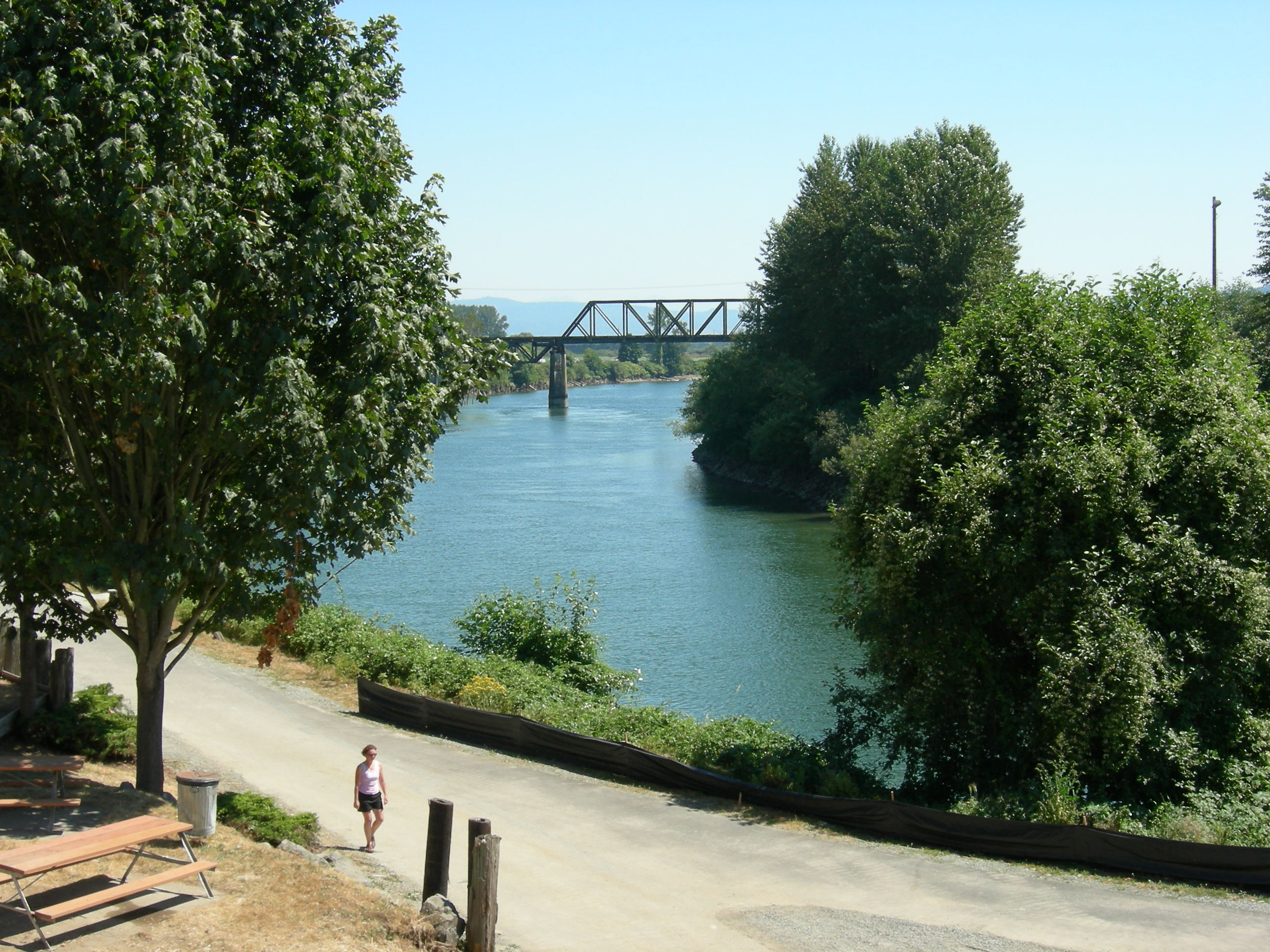
Snohomish River seen from downtown Snohomish in 2006

Snohomish is the eleventh-largest city in its county, with a population of 10,126 as of the 2020 census.

=== 2020 census ===
As of the 2020 census, there were 10,126 people and 4,175 households living in Snohomish, which had a population density of 2,875.9 inhabitants per square mile (1,110.4/km^{2}). There were 4,347 total housing units, of which 96.0% were occupied and 4.0% were vacant or for occasional use. The racial makeup of the city was 81.2% White, 0.7% Native American and Alaskan Native, 0.7% Black or African American, 2.4% Asian, and 0.5% Native Hawaiian and Pacific Islander. Residents who listed another race were 5.0% of the population and those who identified as more than one race were 9.5% of the population. Hispanic or Latino residents of any race were 9.9% of the population.

Of the 4,175 households in Snohomish, 44.3% were married couples living together and 7.5% were cohabitating but unmarried. Households with a male householder with no spouse or partner were 18.2% of the population, while households with a female householder with no spouse or partner were 30.0% of the population. Out of all households, 28.9% had children under the age of 18 living with them and 30.0% had residents who were 65 years of age or older. There were 4,175 occupied housing units in Snohomish, of which 58.3% were owner-occupied and 41.7% were occupied by renters.

The median age in the city was 39.8 years old for all sexes, 38.3 years old for males, and 41.7 years old for females. Of the total population, 22.5% of residents were under the age of 19; 27.8% were between the ages of 20 and 39; 33.0% were between the ages of 40 and 64; and 16.8% were 65 years of age or older. The gender makeup of the city was 48.3% male and 51.7% female.

=== 2010 census ===
As of the 2010 U.S. census, there were 9,098 people, 3,645 households, and 2,259 families residing in the city. The population density was 2,644.8 inhabitants per square mile (1,021.2/km^{2}). There were 3,959 housing units at an average density of 1,150.9 per square mile (444.4/km^{2}). The racial makeup of the city was 89.0% White, 0.5% African American, 1.1% Native American, 2.1% Asian, 0.3% Pacific Islander, 3.6% from other races, and 3.5% from two or more races. Hispanic or Latino of any race were 8.0% of the population.

There were 3,645 households, of which 34.8% had children under the age of 18 living with them, 40.5% were married couples living together, 15.4% had a female householder with no husband present, 6.1% had a male householder with no wife present, and 38.0% were non-families. 30.2% of all households were made up of individuals, and 9.8% had someone living alone who was 65 years of age or older. The average household size was 2.41 and the average family size was 2.99.

The median age in the city was 37.8 years. 24.3% of residents were under the age of 18; 8.4% were between the ages of 18 and 24; 27.7% were from 25 to 44; 27.9% were from 45 to 64; and 11.7% were 65 years of age or older. The gender makeup of the city was 48.2% male and 51.8% female.

== Government and politics ==
Snohomish is a noncharter code city that has a strong mayor–council government, with an elected mayor and an elected city council. The seven part-time city councilmembers are elected at-large to four-year terms that are staggered, with odd years for elections. The city adopted a council–manager form of government in November 1971 through a referendum. Snohomish switched back to a mayor–council system in 2017 after a referendum that passed by a margin of 11 votes. Aaron Hoffman was elected mayor in 2025. The city government has 50 full-time employees and operated under a $22.7 million budget in 2016. It is led by the city administrator, an unelected position appointed by the mayor and confirmed by a city council vote. Ken Klein has served in the role since 2026.

At the federal level, Snohomish is part of the 1st congressional district, represented by Democrat Suzan DelBene. The district encompasses parts of Snohomish and King counties between Arlington and Bellevue that generally lie east of Interstate 5. At the state level, the city is part of the 44th legislative district, which also includes Mill Creek, southeastern Everett, and unincorporated areas. Snohomish is also wholly part of the Snohomish County Council's 5th district, which also includes Lake Stevens and the Skykomish Valley.

== Parks and recreation ==
The city government has nine developed parks with 167 acres (68 ha) of space reserved for public recreation, nature preserves, or other uses. These include Ferguson Park and Hill Park on Blackmans Lake; Morgantown Park and Pilchuck Park on the Pilchuck River; and Cady Park and KlaHaYa Park in downtown on the Snohomish River. These parks include playgrounds, walking trails, picnic areas, boat launches, and sports fields. The city also owns the local Boys and Girls Club and senior center, leasing them out to their respective organizations. The Snohomish area is also home to several county parks and privately owned recreational spaces that are primarily used for organized youth sports, such as soccer and baseball.

Snohomish is the southern terminus of the Centennial Trail, an intercity multi-use path for pedestrians, cyclists, and equestrians. It connects the city to Lake Stevens and Arlington along a former railroad, terminating to the north at the Skagit County. The trail is maintained by the county government and is planned to be extended south from Snohomish to Woodinville, where it would connect with the Eastrail network. A new trail to the west along the Snohomish River is planned to connect the Centennial Trail to the Interurban Trail in Everett. The Snohomish city government maintains its own network of multi-use paths, which range from gravel and unpaved trails along the Snohomish River to paved connections between downtown and Blackmans Lake.

The city is home to the Snohomish Aquatic Center, a public pool complex built by the Snohomish School District for its high school swim teams. It opened in 2014 at a cost of $22.2 million and was partially funded by the city government, which provides discounts for residents. The facility replaced the Hal Moe Pool, which originally opened in 1972 as an outdoor pool and covered in the 1989 by the school district. The pool was closed in 2007 and was demolished in 2018 to make way for a city park. The new aquatic center was built on the site of the original Snohomish Junior High School, which opened in 1961 and was later replaced by other schools. The campus was demolished in stages between 2012 and 2016.

== Education ==
The Snohomish School District operates public schools that serve residents of Snohomish and nearby unincorporated areas, including Cathcart, Machias, and Three Lakes. As of 2020, the district has a total enrollment of 9,421 students, 488 teachers, and 18 total schools. It has two conventional high schools, Snohomish High School and Glacier Peak High School, and an alternative high school program. These high schools are fed by two middle schools, which in turn draw from ten elementary schools. The district is governed by a five-member school board and had a budget of $154 million for the 2020–21 school year.

The Snohomish area also has several private schools operated by churches and other organizations. The St. Michael Catholic Church founded its parish school in 2007, becoming the sixth in Snohomish County operated under the Archdiocese of Seattle. Other Christian schools include Lighthouse Christian Academy, the Academy of Snohomish, and Zion Lutheran School.

== Culture ==
=== Arts ===
The city's largest performing arts venue is Tim Noah's Thumbnail Theater, a non-profit theater at the historic Church of Christ, Scientist. It was founded in 2003 and hosts theatrical performances, concerts, and improv comedy among other forms of entertainment.

Several films have been shot in Snohomish, including 1981 comedy-drama Bustin' Loose and the 1985 drama Twice in a Lifetime. The city's high school was also a setting in the 1983 film WarGames, which was primarily filmed in California.

=== Events ===
Snohomish hosts an annual summer festival called Kla Ha Ya Days, which attracts up to 25,000 visitors and began in 1913. It is one of several community events affiliated with the regional Seafair, held annually in July.

=== Media ===
The city is part of the Seattle–Tacoma media market and is served by a daily newspaper, The Everett Herald. A local weekly newspaper, the Snohomish County Tribune, is published in Snohomish.

Snohomish's public library is operated by Sno-Isle Libraries, a regional system that annexed the city-run library. Located near downtown, the 23,000-square-foot (2,100 m^{2}) building is the third-largest in the Sno-Isle system and serves over 5,000 weekly patrons. It opened in July 2003 at a cost of $8 million, replacing an earlier Carnegie library building that was a third of the size. The Snohomish library was named one of the favorite libraries of book commentator and celebrity librarian Nancy Pearl in 2008.

The city was home to Snohomish County's first lending library, founded by local citizens in 1876. A permanent library building funded by Andrew Carnegie opened in 1910 and was expanded in 1968 with the construction of an annex that doubled its size. The building was determined to be too small to adequately meet Snohomish's needs in the 1990s, leading to proposals to build a second annex or replace it with a new building. The library building was converted into a temporary space for art exhibits following its closure in 2003 and was later used as a rentable community center. The building closed again in 2017 to undergo a $2.7 million renovation, which included demolition of the 1968 annex and restoration of an original crystal chandelier. It reopened in 2021.

=== Sports ===
Snohomish has several semi-professional soccer teams and hosts major youth soccer tournaments at Stocker Fields. The tournaments are organized by Snohomish Youth Soccer, which also operates Snohomish United, a USL League Two team that is planned to debut in 2025. The Snohomish Sky was founded in 2023 and operates men's and women's teams in the United Premier Soccer League and Western Indoor Soccer League. The Snohomish Soccer Dome also hosts practices for the Washington Wolfpack, an Arena Football League team that plays in Everett.

=== Notable people ===
Snohomish has produced several professional athletes in American football, baseball, basketball, and ice hockey, including three baseball players named "Earl."

- Earl Averill, professional baseball player and Baseball Hall of Fame inductee
- Earl Averill Jr., professional baseball player
- Lexi Bender, professional ice hockey player
- Kyle Bjornethun, professional soccer player
- Jon Brockman, professional basketball player
- Tom Cable, American football offensive line coach and assistant head coach
- Adam Eaton, professional baseball player
- David Eddings, fantasy writer
- Emory C. Ferguson, county commissioner and co-founder of Snohomish
- Chelsey Glasson, American user researcher and author
- Keith Gilbertson, professional American football player and coach
- Roy Grover, professional baseball player
- Larry Gunselman, NASCAR driver
- Kevin Hamlin, NASCAR driver
- Richard Harriman, NASCAR driver
- Bret Ingalls, American football offensive line coach
- Curt Marsh, professional American football player
- Finn McKenty, YouTuber
- Jesper Myrfors, card game art director and creative officer
- Jeff Ogden, professional American football player
- Jim Ollom, professional baseball player
- John Patric, author, journalist, and perennial candidate
- Don Poier, sports announcer
- Chris Reykdal, elected official and former state legislator
- Theodore Rinaldo, religious leader, businessman, and convicted child sex offender
- Doug Roulstone, Navy officer and state representative
- Chrissy Teigen, author and professional model
- Karen Thorndike, sailor and solo circumnavigator
- Earl Torgeson, county commissioner and professional baseball player
- Willis Tucker, journalist and county executive
- Hal Uderitz, professional soccer player
- Josh Vanlandingham, professional basketball player
- Fred W. Vetter Jr., Air Force brigadier general
- Brooke Whitney, professional ice hockey player

== Infrastructure ==
=== Transportation ===
Snohomish is bisected by two major highways: U.S. Route 2 (US 2), which bypasses the city to the north and east, continuing on to Everett and Stevens Pass; and State Route 9, which runs north–south and connects to Woodinville and Lake Stevens. Other major roads in Snohomish include Bickford Avenue (which continues south as Avenue D), which formerly carried US 2 and is named for a local car dealership, Machias Road (Maple Avenue), and 2nd Street (92nd Street).

Community Transit, the countywide public transit authority, provides bus, paratransit, and vanpool service to Snohomish from surrounding cities. Two routes travel from Everett Station to Snohomish and continue east along US 2 to Monroe, Sultan, and Gold Bar. Another route travels from Lynnwood and Mill Creek to Snohomish and follows the State Route 9 corridor north to Lake Stevens. Community Transit also operates a commuter bus route that connects Snohomish and Monroe to Downtown Bellevue with intermediate stops on Interstate 405. The city has one park and ride lot, located near Avenue D and State Route 9, that is owned by the Washington State Department of Transportation (WSDOT).

The city was formerly served by the Everett–Snohomish Interurban, an electric interurban railway that ceased operations in 1921. A small replica train depot was opened in 2005 near the Avenue D Bridge to serve as a visitors center.

A privately owned airport, Harvey Airfield, is situated to the south of downtown Snohomish. It was established in 1944 and remains under the ownership of the Harvey family. The airport is generally used for general aviation and small businesses, including skydiving clubs and hot air balloon operators.

=== Utilities ===
Utility services for residents and businesses in Snohomish are split between the city government and other providers. The Snohomish County Public Utility District provides electric power to customers Snohomish and most of the county, while Puget Sound Energy supplies natural gas. The city government contracts with Republic Services for collection and disposal of curbside garbage, recycling, and yard waste. Since the closure of the Cathcart Landfill near Snohomish in 1992, garbage is generally sent to a landfill in Roosevelt for processing and burial.

The city government manages tap water service within Snohomish, which is delivered through a 35-mile (56 km) system of pipes. The city purchases 90 percent of its water from the City of Everett, which sources from Spada Lake and the Sultan River basin; the remainder is purchased from the Snohomish County Public Utility District, which treats well water near Lake Stevens. The city government operated its own water treatment plant on the Pilchuck River near Granite Falls until 2017, when it was determined to be too costly to maintain and upgrade to meet modern fish passage standards. A portion of Snohomish is within the service area of the Cross Valley Water District, which primarily serves unincorporated areas south of the city.

Snohomish's wastewater system consists of a combined overflow for downtown and other older neighborhoods and a separated sewage and stormwater system for the rest of the city. A plan to replace the combined overflow system was approved in 2014 following interventions by the Washington State Department of Ecology. The city's wastewater treatment plant on the Snohomish River was upgraded, replacing an earlier proposal to send sewage to the City of Everett for treatment.

=== Health care ===
The city's nearest general hospital is EvergreenHealth Monroe, managed by a public hospital district that includes Snohomish and the Skykomish Valley. Until its affiliation with the EvergreenHealth system in 2015, it was known as the Valley General Hospital. Snohomish is home to several general and specialty clinics, including those managed by Providence Health & Services and The Everett Clinic.
