= Harvey Airfield =

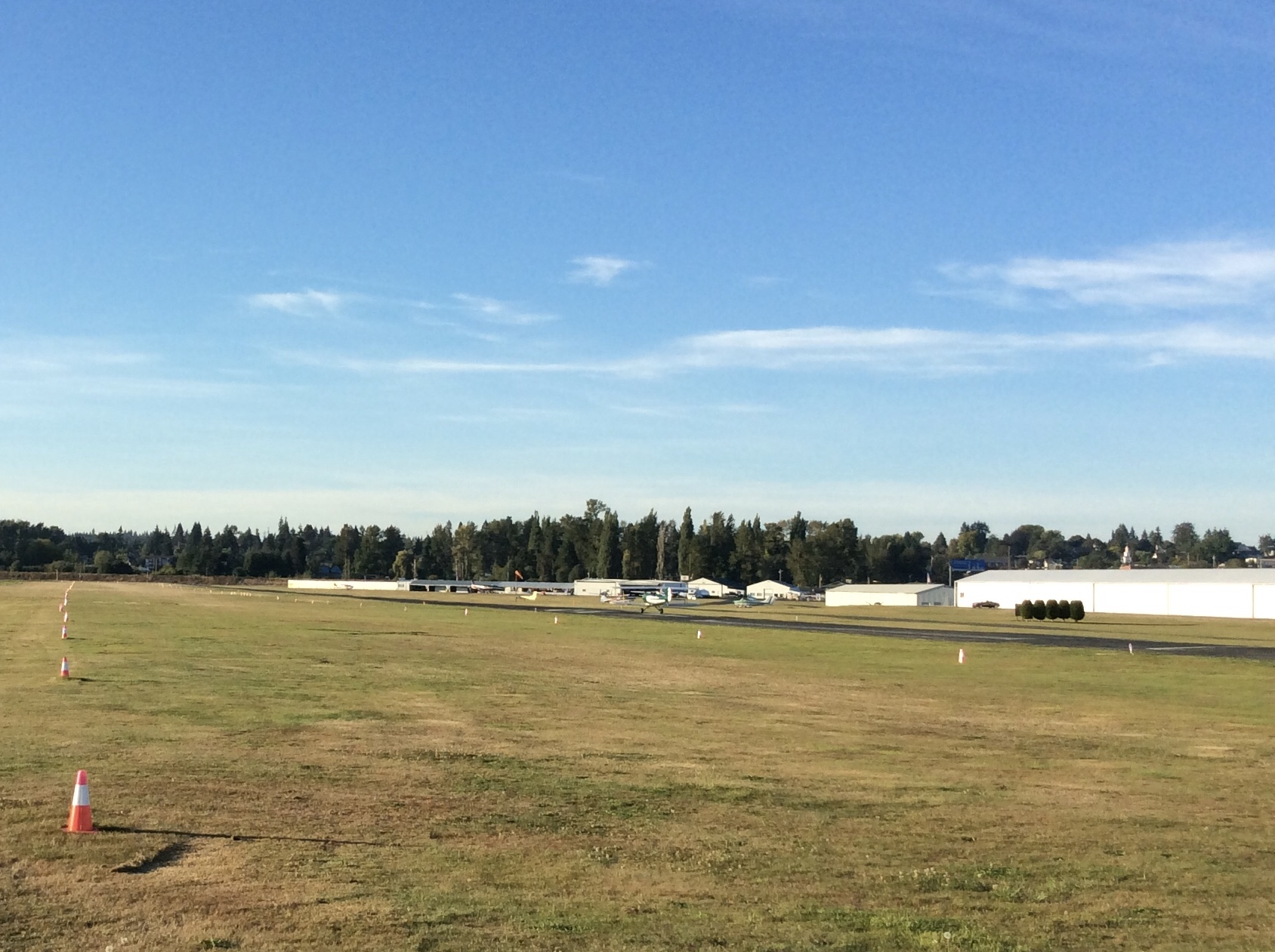
- Runway at Harvey Airfield in 2020
- IATA: none; ICAO: none; FAA LID: S43

Summary
- Airport type: Public
- Owner: Kandace Harvey
- Location: Snohomish, Washington, U.S.
- Elevation AMSL: 16 ft (4.9 m)
- Coordinates: 47°54′22″N 122°06′5″W
- Website: harveyfield.com

Map
- Location in Washington S43 (the United States)

Runways
Direction	Length		Surface
Direction	ft	m	Surface
33R/15L	2,671	814	Asphalt
33L/15R	2,430	741	Turf

Statistics
- Aircraft operations (2016): 100,220
- Based aircraft (2017): 261
- Sources: Federal Aviation Administration, Harvey Field website, and Snohomish County Business Journal

Harvey Airfield, also known as Harvey Field (FAA LID: S43), is a privately owned, public-use airport in Snohomish, Washington, United States, northeast of Seattle. The airfield has one 2,671-foot (814 m) asphalt runway, one 2,430-foot (740 m) turf runway, and fourteen hangar bays. It covers an area of approximately 145 acres (0.23 sq mi; 0.59 km^{2}), and is home to 261 based aircraft, including 9 helicopters and 9 multi-engine planes, as well as 19 businesses including a hot-air balloon charter business.

It is included in the Federal Aviation Administration (FAA) National Plan of Integrated Airport Systems for 2017–2021, in which it is categorized as a regional reliver facility.

== History ==
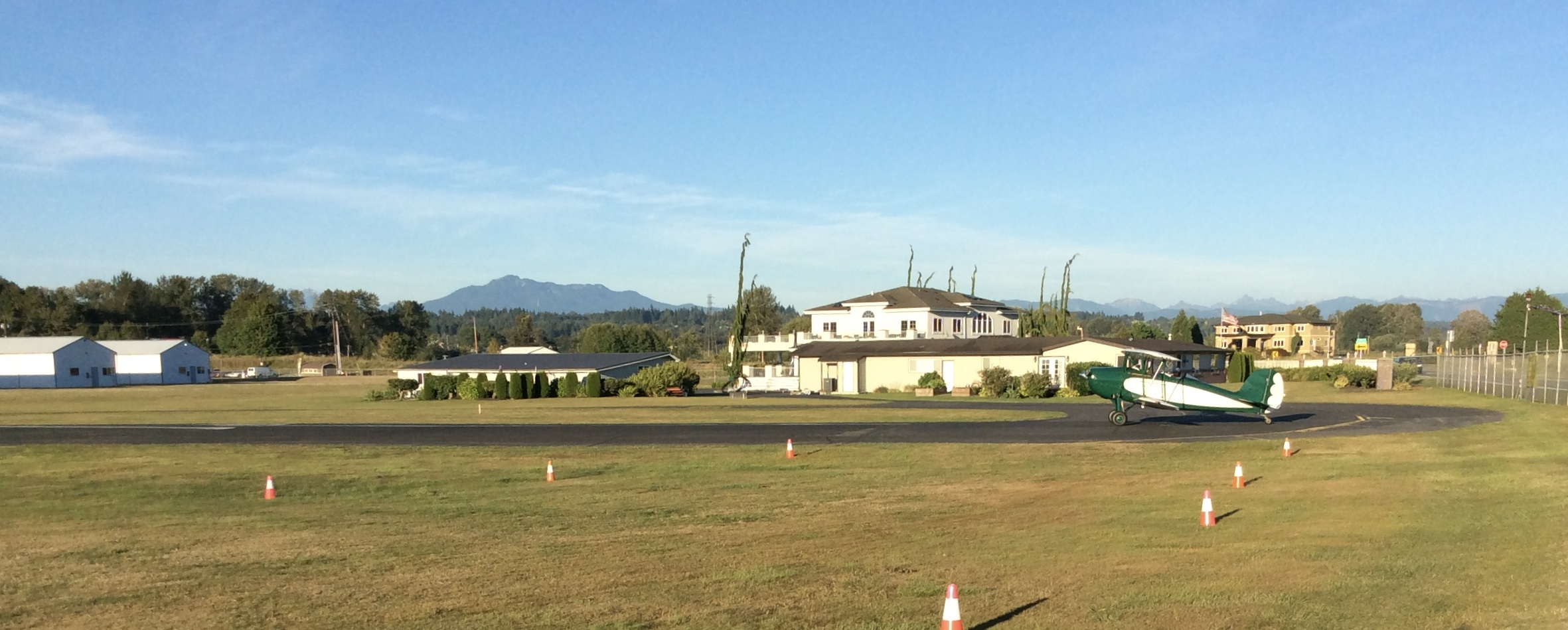
Biplane at Harvey Airfield taxiing for takeoff

Harvey Airfield was established in 1944 by Noble and Eldon Harvey and Wesley Loback on the Harvey family's property, which had previously hosted a barnstorming event in 1911. A restaurant, an administration building, and a maintenance shop were added to the airfield by the Harvey family in 1947. The airfield was run by Eldon and Marjorie until Richard and Kandace Harvey began managing airfield operations in the early 1970s. After Richard Harvey died due to cancer in 1995, Kandace Harvey took over ownership and operation of the airport with her four children.

Like many small airports, Harvey Field provides flight training in small airplanes and helicopters. The airport also provides other traditional services offered by aviation fixed-base operators, including avgas and aircraft maintenance. The airport is located outside the Seattle-Tacoma International Airport Class B airspace but is underneath the 30-nm veil that requires an altitude encoding transponder for aircraft equipped with an electrical system.

The airport is located in the floodplain of the Snohomish River, which has periodically flooded the runway, including a major flood in 1990; a levee was built in 1995. In 2005, the Snohomish County government petitioned the Federal Emergency Management Agency (FEMA) to reclassify the area around Harvey Airfield as a former flood hazard zone to allow for development and potential expansion. The action and other studies to determine impact on the local environment were opposed by local residents and later the City of Snohomish due to potential noise and traffic issues in addition to flood hazards. The asphalt runway was resurfaced in 2021.

In 2024, Harvey proposed replacement of the existing runway with a shorter, 2,400-foot (730 m) runway shifted to the south and west to improve visibility. The project would require the realignment of Airport Way on the south side of the property.

== Notable incidents ==
In October 1978, a Douglas C-54 Skymaster arrived at Harvey Airfield and landed on runway 32 (now 33), striking its left wingtip on a dead tree and demolishing a Chevrolet van with its right main landing gear. In spite of damage, the plane landed successfully and later successfully flew out to nearby Arlington Municipal Airport for repairs.

== See also ==
- List of airports in Washington
