= Snohomish High School =

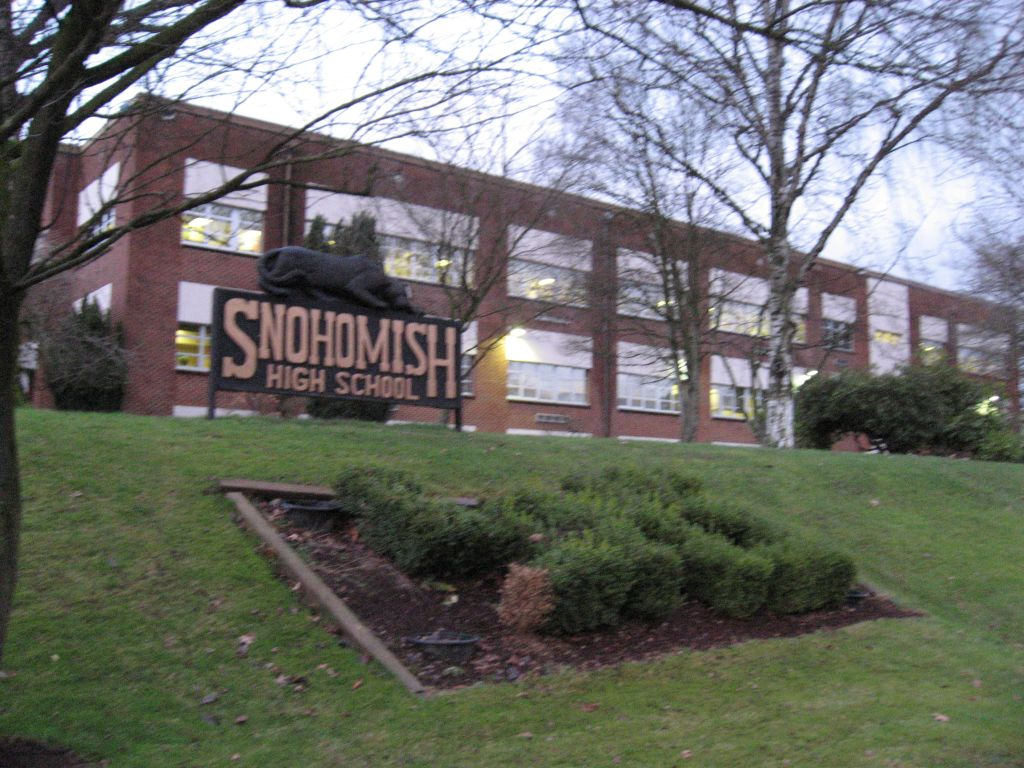

Location
- 1316 5th Street; Snohomish, Washington 98290; United States; 47°55′08″N 122°06′00″W

Information
- School type: Public, high school
- Established: 1894; 132 years ago
- Principal: Nate DuChesne
- Teaching staff: 68.70 (FTE)
- Grades: 9–12
- Enrollment: 1,525 (2023-2024)
- Student to teacher ratio: 22.20
- Colors: White & Red
- Nickname: Panthers
- Website: Official website

Snohomish High School (SHS) is a secondary school located in the Snohomish School District, in Snohomish, Washington, United States. SHS, built for 1200 students, contains 1,565 9th–12th graders (as of 2022–23).

== History ==
Before SHS actually opened it was a courthouse with a small jail section underneath. SHS first opened in 1894 at the completion of the original A building. The school underwent many remodels through the 1980s, including changes to the B building. These changes removed the last vestiges of 'old' Snohomish High School, making the building completely modern. Among the changes made to the B building were the removal of its decades-old fixed wooden bleachers and over-painting of many student-painted murals from the 1960s and earlier. There were also additions of music, science, and vocational buildings during this time. In an attempt to curb overcrowding, the C building was constructed and opened in 1999, adding ten more classrooms. As the school became more crowded, it received a grant to remodel the campus, tearing down the B building was a major change. Parts of B building have been incorporated into the schools newer buildings.

== Sports and athletics ==
SHS is a member of the WESCO 3A division of Washington state, and has won several state championships in both boys’ and girls’ sports.

=== State championships won ===
- Baseball (1998, 2008)
- Basketball, boys' (1970)
- Cross country, boys' (1960, 1965)
- Cross country, girls' (1995, 1996, 2002, 2003)
- Fastpitch softball (2016)
- Football (1976, 1978)
- Golf, boys' (2001, 2009)
- Soccer, boys' (2000, 2006, 2014, 2015)
- Soccer, girls' (1984, 1997)
- Swimming, boys' (2006, 2007, 2008)
- Track & Field, girls' (1988, 2001, 2002)
- MCJROTC drill and rifle' (2017,2018,2020,2022,2024,2025,2026)

== Notable alumni ==
- Earl Averill Jr. - MLB player with the Cleveland Indians, Chicago Cubs, Chicago White Sox, Philadelphia Phillies, and an original member of the Los Angeles Angels; All American at University of Oregon
- Jon Brockman, NBA player, University of Washington's all-time leading rebounder and second-all-time leading scorer
- Steve Hardin - CFL player offensive guard
