= Jane Rucker =

American pioneer

Jane Morris Rucker
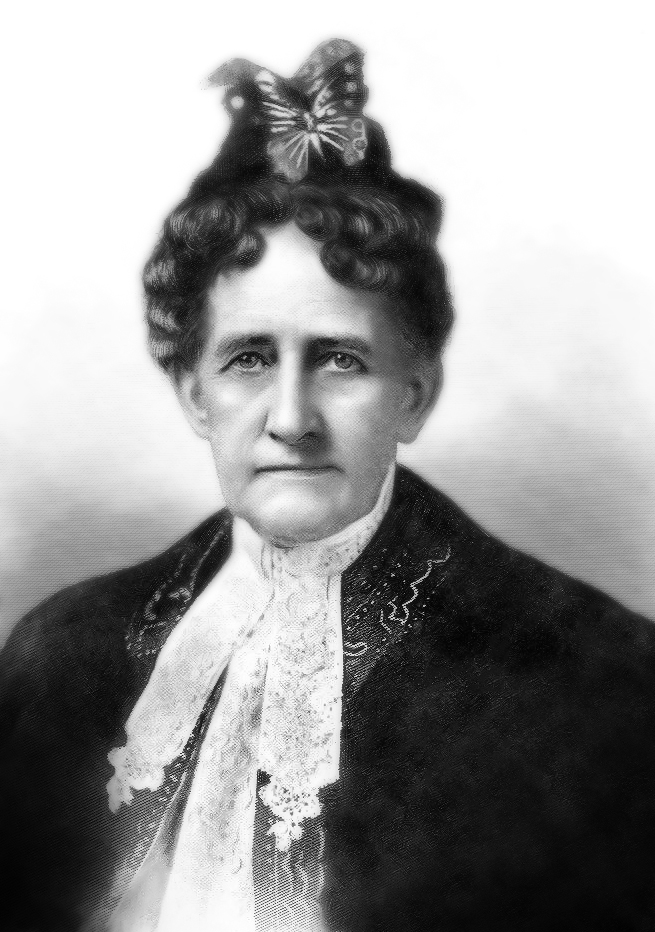
- Born: January 29, 1830; Ohio, U.S.
- Died: November 10, 1907 (aged 77); Everett, Washington, U.S.
- Burial place: Evergreen Cemetery, Everett, Washington, U.S.
- Monuments: Rucker Mausoleum
- Organization: Woman's Book Club
- Known for: A pioneer of Everett, Washington and the first female resident of the city. Mother, partner, and advisor of the Rucker Brothers, who are known as one of Everett's first landowners and vital developers of the city, its infrastructure and enterprises.
- Children: 7, including: Wyatt Rucker; Bethel Rucker

Jane Morris Rucker (January 29, 1830 – November 10, 1907) was a pioneer of Everett, Washington. She was the first female resident of Everett, coming to the area in 1889. Jane Rucker and two of her sons, Wyatt and Bethal, were among the largest landowners of the city. Wyatt and Bethal executed real estate dealings and were later known as the "Fathers of Everett," while Jane served as their partner and principal advisor.

The Ruckers were one of the first two landowners and non-indigenous inhabitants at the site of the future Everett City. They settled on the Port Gardner Peninsula (now central Everett) in 1890, bought a large amount of land, and engaged in platting the town of Port Gardner with other pioneers of the area. Later, the Ruckers joined forces with John D. Rockefeller, Charles L. Colby, and Colgate Hoyt. Plans for the town of Port Gardner were later folded into the City of Everett. The Rucker family owned 50 acres (20 ha) of downtown Everett and in 1891 they were the first to put the city's platted lots on the market. In 1905, the family moved into the Rucker Mansion, which would later be surrounded by other large residences that form the modern-day Rucker Hill neighborhood.

After Rucker's death, her sons built the Rucker Monument, which later became the family mausoleum in Everett's Evergreen Cemetery. Originally, the mausoleum was adorned with a seated statue of Jane Rucker.

== Early life and family ==
Rucker was born in Ohio on January 29, 1830, to Moses Morris and Sarah Morris. Moses served as minister for more than 50 years. Both of the parents were pioneers from Ohio. Rucker married Wyatt Rucker, also the son of a long-time minister, in 1850. The Ruckers were members of the Baptist Church and had seven children, four girls and three boys.

Wyatt Rucker died on May 27, 1878, in Ohio and was buried there. On November 4, 1929, his remains were moved to the Rucker Mausoleum in Everett, Washington.

== Pioneer life ==
=== Arriving in Everett ===
Jane Rucker and her two sons Wyatt and Bethel Rucker moved from Noble County, Ohio, to Tacoma, Washington in 1888.

In 1889, after James J. Hill's announcement that the Great Northern Railway would come over the Cascade Mountains to Puget Sound region, the excitement rose that it would also reach the Port Gardner Peninsula (an area formed by the Snohomish River and Port Gardner Bay, which later became a central part of the City of Everett). That same year, after reading about the opportunities for development of Snohomish County, the Ruckers moved to the peninsula. Jane Rucker also became the first female resident of Everett.

At the time of the Ruckers' arrival, the area mainly consisted of forests and was sparsely settled by Coast Salish peoples. There were no marked roads or merchant routes, and the primary way to get provisions to the area was by boat.

=== Developing Everett ===
By 1890, the family bought 1,000 acres (400 ha) of land on the Port Gardner peninsula (which later became Everett's downtown), becoming one of the first two non-indigenous landowners of the city's lands. They built their house there and started to plat the townsite of Port Gardner in partnership with William G. Swalwell, his brother Wellington, and Frank B. Friday.

Their plans for Port Gardner were interrupted by Henry Hewitt Jr., a lumberman and land speculator from Tacoma. He sought the establishment of an industrial city on a much larger scale. Hewitt invited John D. Rockefeller, American Steel Barge Company president Charles L. Colby, and Great Northern director Colgate Hoyt to invest in the area's development. After securing a funding agreement, he persuaded the Ruckers, Friday, and Swalwell to join the development scheme. They agreed to cooperate and each of them transferred half of their holdings (overall, near 800 acres (320 ha) of land) to the East Coast syndicate. Despite giving away a substantial part of their property, the Ruckers still ended up personally owning 50 acres (20 ha) of Everett's downtown and platted modern-day Rucker Hill. In 1891, they were the ones to put the first platted lots of Everett on the market and reaped a considerable profit from it.

In November 1890, the townsite was renamed Everett. The Everett Land Company was organized, spurring and managing all of the area's rapid development. The Rucker brothers were the company's co-founders and ran it for several years.

Everett was incorporated as a city in 1893. It had its own infrastructure and enterprises and grew to 5,000 people. However, the Panic of 1893 and the national economic depression that came afterwards almost destroyed the city's businesses and infrastructure; many citizens fled the area. The city's government was almost bankrupt and additionally John Rockefeller started to withdraw his investments. Surviving the hardships, the city started to recover in 1899, when James J. Hill and his Everett Improvement Company bought the holdings of Rockefeller and the Everett Land Company (more than 6,000 acres (2,400 ha) of Everett's townsite). The Rucker brothers took an active part in closing the deal between the businessmen.

In different accounts, Jane Rucker was described as "a woman of exceptional ability," "intelligent and independent," and was considered a partner and advisor in the business affairs of her sons. Wyatt and Bethel Rucker have since been recognized as Everett's founding fathers.

The Ruckers also donated some of their property to house Everett's early factories and were involved in major city negotiations, such as the construction of a harbor. They owned the Monte Cristo Hotel and the park nearby, were in charge of the Everett and Monte Cristo Railway and of the Everett Terminal Company. They built a mountain resort, the Big Four Inn, had interests in several banking enterprises and commercial organizations, engaged in timber and mining businesses.

=== Later life in Everett ===
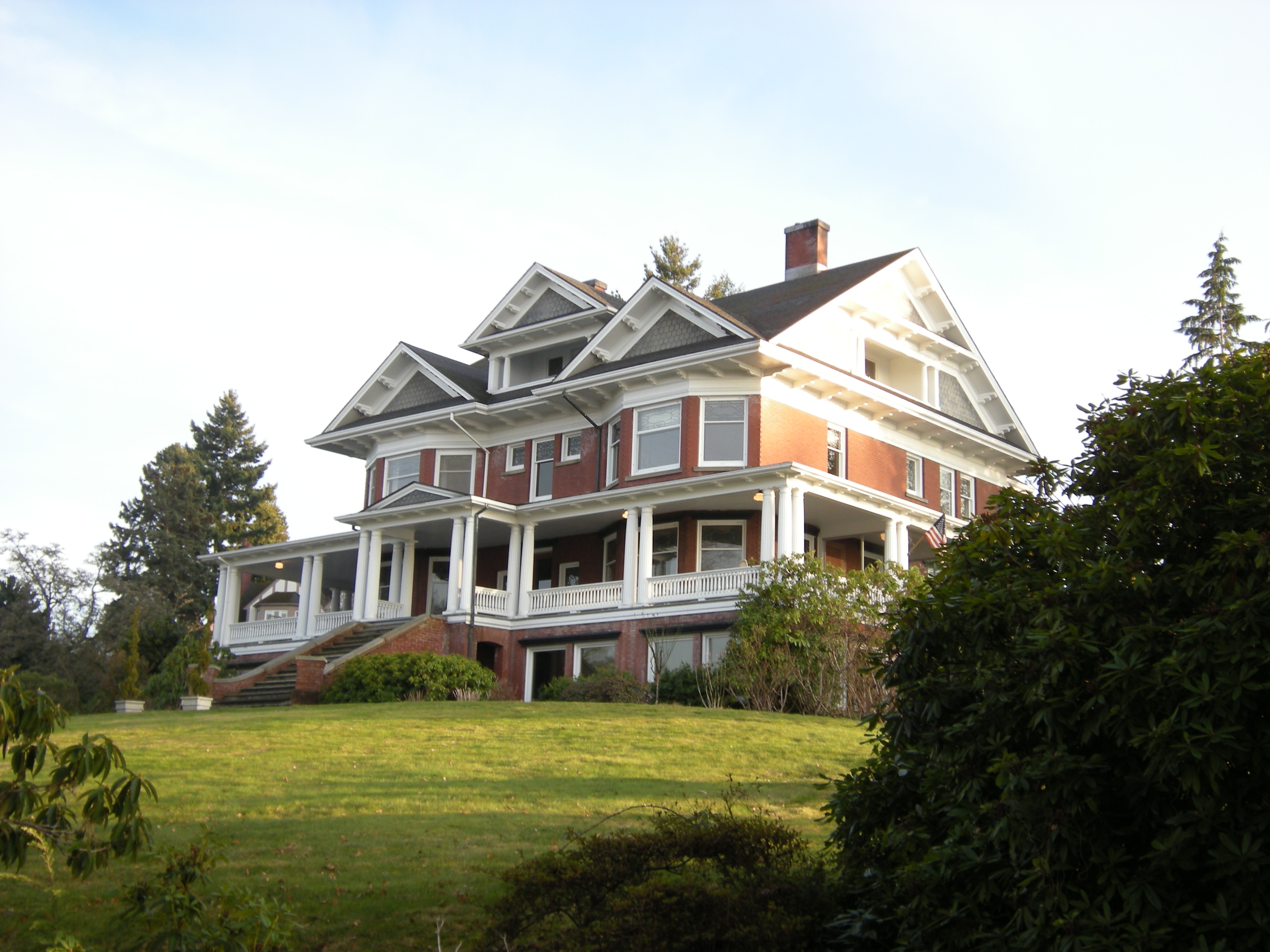
Rucker Mansion, 2009

In 1905, Jane Rucker, her two sons, and daughter-in-law moved into the Rucker Mansion on a hill overlooking Port Gardner Bay. The Ruckers attracted other elite families to the area, which was later known as Rucker Hill. Their residence became a setting point for a district of upper class homes that have since been preserved as a designated national historic district.

== Personal life, family, and death ==
Rucker was a life member of the Woman's Book Club.

Rucker died on November 10, 1907, at the family mansion in Everett. She was outlived by her three sons – Wyatt J., Bethal J., William Rucker, and one of her daughters.

== Historic legacy ==
=== Rucker Mausoleum ===
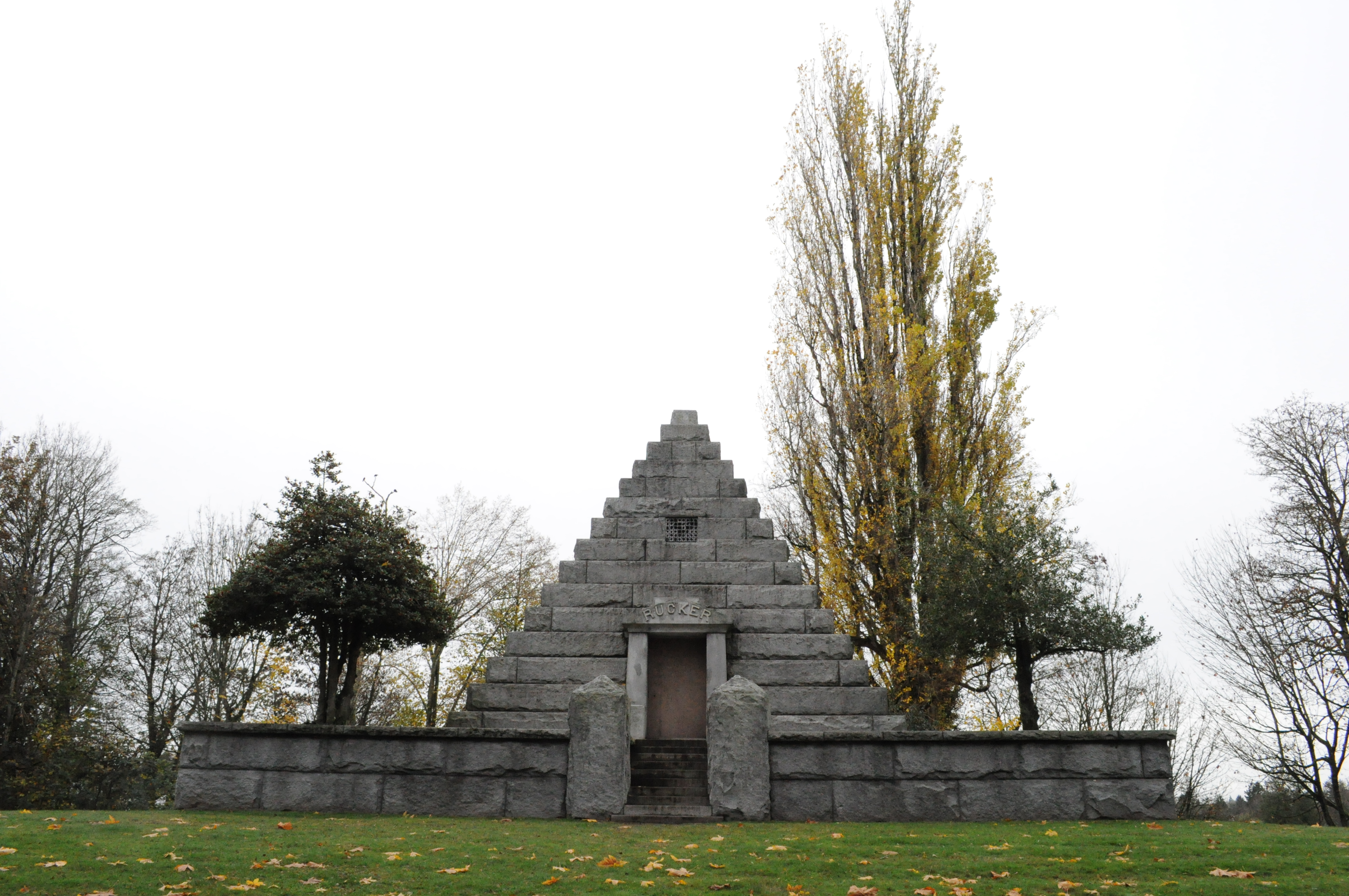
Rucker Mausoleum, 2009

After Jane Rucker's death, her sons built a pyramid-shaped monument with a tomb inside in Evergreen Cemetery honoring their mother. It is considered to be the largest monument in the cemetery and "one of the grandest tombs in the country." At some point, Jane Rucker's large seated statue stood over the doorway, but it was dismantled. The inscription on the door of the mausoleum dedicated to Jane Rucker by her sons read "The Pioneer of Everett, The True Wife, The Perfect Mother, The Soul of Honor." Her husband was also moved into the mausoleum in 1929.

The 30-foot (9.1 m) tall granite tomb became a family mausoleum for more than 20 family members and has a 9 by 9 feet (2.7 by 2.7 m) chapel area. The mausoleum was appraised at $30,000 ($805,000 in 2021 dollars (Note: The approximate value converted to 2021 dollars, based on a standard adjustment of the 1913 dollar value using the Consumer Price Index as calculated by United States Department of Labor.)).

In 1994, the film Assassins was filmed at the tomb. Ever since the monument was built, it has attracted attention of vandals. In 2008, the damage done to the tomb and nearby graves was appraised at $12,000 ($15,000).

=== Other familial historic landmarks ===
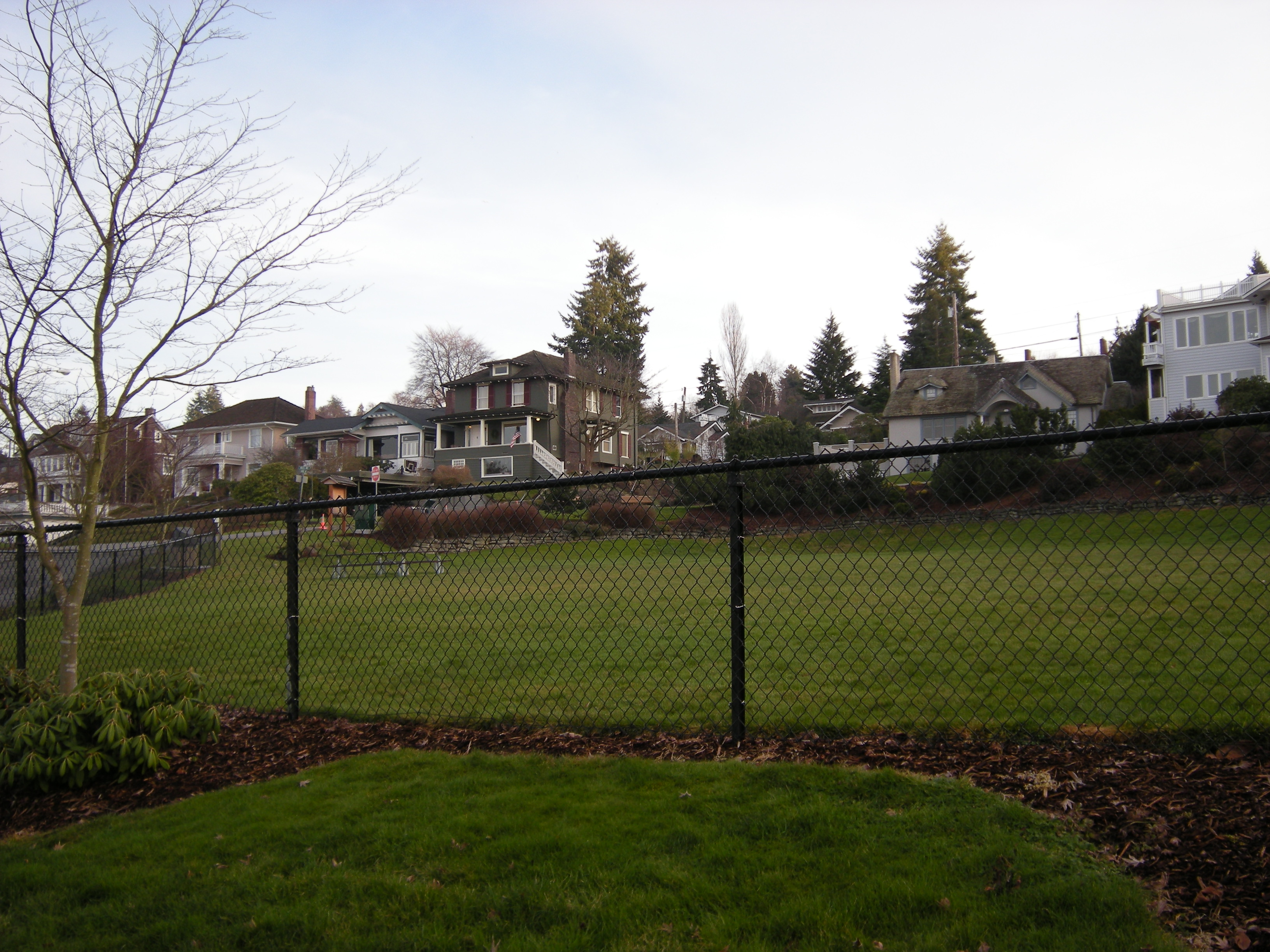
Rucker Hill Park, 2009

There a few other Everett locations that bear the Rucker family name like the Rucker Hill, Rucker Avenue, and the Rucker Mansion.

- The 13,000-square-foot (1,200 m^{2}) Rucker Mansion, where Jane Rucker spent the last years of her life from 1905 to 1907, is considered "the boldest, biggest mansion" of old Everett buildings and "the most beautiful site in the city." The construction was appraised at $40,000 ($1,000,000 in 2021 dollars). The Rucker family owned the mansion until 1923. In 1974 or 1975, the mansion was placed on the National Register of Historic Places register.
- The Rucker Hill Historic District is a residential area above Port Gardner Bay in Everett, Washington. It was listed on the National Register of Historic Places in 1989.

== Literature cited ==
- "CPI Inflation Calculator", Bureau of Labor Statistics, Washington: United States Department of Labor
- "Port Gardner Neighborhood, self-guided history tour, Everett, Washington", historiceverett.org, Everett: Historic Everett
- "Rucker Hill Historic District", LivingPlaces.com, Morrisville: The Gombach Group
- "They were pioneers", The Spokesman-Review, Spokane: Cowles Company, p. 7, November 15, 1907, ISSN 1064-7317, LCCN sn84024754, OCLC 11102610
- Whitfield, William M., ed. (1926), History of Snohomish County, Washington, vol. 1, Chicago: Pioneer Historical Publishing Company, LCCN 85190494, OCLC 8437390
- Robinson, Jean B., ed. (September 1, 1993), "In Memoriam: Joshua Eldon Rucker" (PDF), Rucker Family Society Newsletter, vol. 4, no. 3, Richmond: Rucker Family Society, p. 29, OCLC 34280093
- "Rucker's Tomb – Tribute to a Mother's Love", Adventure Sisters, Pacific Northwest: PNW Adventure Sisters, May 12, 2018
- Bunch, J. E. (August 8, 2015), Suitt, Sandee (ed.), "Historical Perspective: Early settlers in region included Ruckers", Daily News Journal, Tysons: Gannett, ISSN 0745-2683, OCLC 9008844
- Holtz, Jackson (July 17, 2008), "Vandals cause $12,000 damage at Evergreen Cemetery in Everett", HeraldNet.com, Everett: Sound Publishing Inc., ISSN 2332-0079, LCCN sn86071992, OCLC 304341898
- Hunt, Herbert; Kaylor, Floyd C. (1917), Washington, west of the Cascades; historical and descriptive; the explorers, the Indians, the pioneers, the modern, Chicago: S. J. Clarke Publishing Company, LCCN 18015511, OCLC 10086413
- Muhlstein, Julie (February 4, 2012), "Found photos may show Everett's early pioneers", HeraldNet.com, Everett: Sound Publishing Inc., ISSN 2332-0079, LCCN sn86071992, OCLC 304341898
- Oakley, Janet (July 26, 2005), "Everett — Thumbnail History", HistoryLink, Seattle: History Ink, OCLC 124224498
- Oldham, Kit (April 4, 2008), "The Ruckers move into their new mansion in Everett, whose rapid growth they have helped promote, in the summer of 1905", HistoryLink, Seattle: History Ink, OCLC 124224498
- Prosser, William Farrand (1903), Lewis, Edward Gardner (ed.), A history of the Puget Sound country, its resources, its commerce and its people, New York City: Edward Gardner Lewis, LCCN 05013767
- Shiach, William Sidney; Averill, Harrison B. (1906), An Illustrated History of Skagit and Snohomish Counties: their people, their commerce and their resources, with an outline of the early history of the state of Washington (PDF), Chicago: Interstate Publishing Company, LCCN 06030900, OCLC 11299996
