= Rucker Mansion (Everett, Washington) =

Historic house in Washington, United States

- U.S. National Register of Historic Places
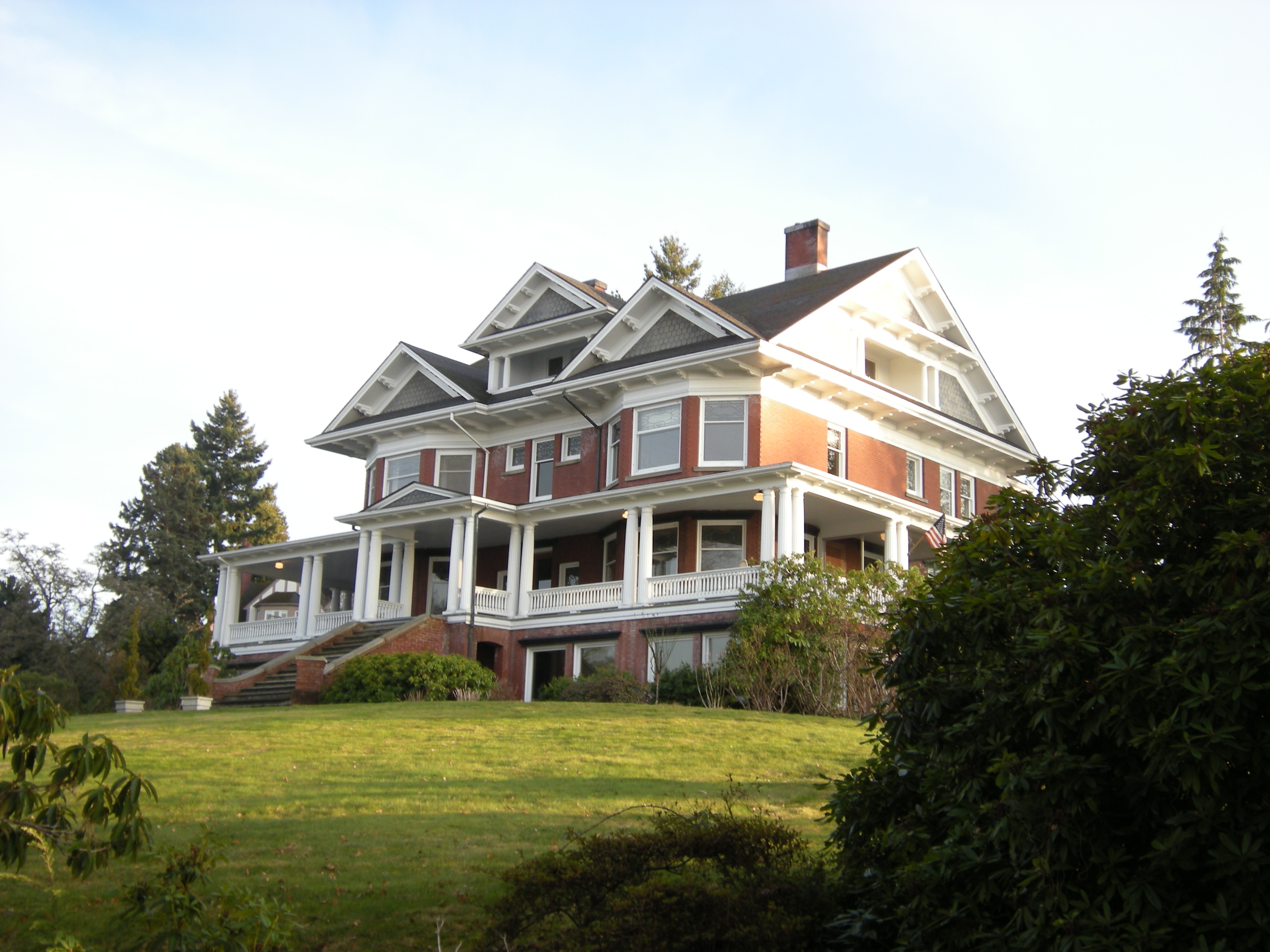

- Location within Washington (state)
- Location: 412 Laurel Dr., Everett, Washington
- Coordinates: 47°58′23″N 122°13′21″W
- Area: 2.7 acres (1.1 ha)
- Built: 1904
- Architectural style: Mixed (more Than 2 Styles From Different Periods)
- NRHP reference No.: 75001869
- Added to NRHP: December 4, 1975

The Rucker Mansion, also known as the Rucker House, is a private residence located in Everett, Washington, United States, and is registered with the National Register of Historic Places (NRHP). According to the registry, the home was originally commissioned for $40,000 by the Rucker family as a wedding gift for Ruby Brown, who married Bethel Rucker in December 1904. The construction of the Rucker Mansion was completed approximately in July 1905. That same year, local newspaper, the Everett Herald, described the mansion as, “without a doubt, one of the finest residences ever constructed in the Northwest.”

== Location ==
The residence is located on the plateau of Rucker Hill also known as Rucker Heights, an area southwest of downtown Everett, and provides views of the city, Port Gardner, the Cascade Mountains, and the Olympic Mountains. The residential address is listed as 412 Laurel Drive, Everett, WA, United States. This area has since been recognized as Rucker Hill Historic District by the NRHP.

== History ==
The Rucker family, composed of the matriarch, Jane Rucker, and her two sons Wyatt and Bethel, migrated to Western Washington in the late 19th century from Ohio. They were drawn to the area in a search for investment opportunities and selected land in Everett/Port Gardner Bay region. This site consisted of dense timber forestation and was a future location for a Great Northern Railway terminal. The Ruckers began purchasing thousands of acres in hopes of establishing a township, but then pivoted and joined in a partnership with Henry Hewitt to establish the Everett Land Company. Hewitt recruited investors, particularly Charles Colby and John D. Rockefeller, who aided in financing building the city of Everett and a successful timber business. Despite investing into their company, the Rucker's maintained possession of fifty percent of their land prospects, many of which were later developed into residential real estate. Rucker Hill was part of these housing developments and the Rucker Mansion was constructed on the most prime section of real estate overlooking the city. The Ruckers moved into the residence in the summer of 1905 and lived there until 1923, when the home was sold to Clyde Walton for $32,000. The Walton family lived in the home until 1959. The home has since maintained its private residence status, having been bought and sold in the real estate market over the past 50 years.

According to Zillow, in 1997, the home was sold for $650,000. Currently, for the first time in 22 years, Rucker Mansion is on the market for $3.5 million as of August, 2020. It is speculated that the mansion may be haunted by the matriarch of the family, Jane Rucker, who died in the home in 1907. Her cause of death has been debated over the years with unconfirmed rumors that she committed suicide by jumping to her death from the bedroom window. One particular unexplained phenomenon has been the sound of a piano playing at the residence while no one was home.

== Architecture ==
The architectural style has been labeled as a combination of Queen Anne, Italian Villa and Georgian Revival. It is a 4-story building, composed primarily of a three layer brick masonry exterior, accommodating approximately 10,000 square feet of living space with 6 bedrooms, 6 and 3/4 baths and 6 fireplaces. The home is wrapped on three sides by a large wooden porch with 28 supporting Roman Doric columns. The interior is finished with extensive woodworking craftsmanship consisting of combinations of oak, mahogany and marble.

Entrance. The entrance to the Rucker home has walls adorned with velvet fabric originally made by W. & J. Sloane in New York City. The entrance is further encased in white oak and has a Birchwood ceiling leading up the stairs to the next level.

Smoking Room. The smoking room of the Rucker Mansion is filled with extensive woodwork primarily Bird's Eye Maple and Honduran Mahogany. The walls are draped in leather and the centerpiece of the room is a large granite fireplace.

Kitchen. The original kitchen of the Rucker home has been extensively remodeled. Careful attention was made to match the original look of the kitchen. Modern appliances are hidden behind panels of matching woodwork and the original floor has been replaced with Rojo Coralita Marble that was repurposed from the floor of the Seattle Opera House.

Master Bedroom and Bathroom. The master bedroom is located on the second-floor and includes a recently remodeled bathroom. The bedroom itself is positioned in the home providing views of the Olympic and Cascade mountain ranges, as well as the Puget Sound. The bathroom has been modernized but still contains much of the original character. It is furnished with heated Carrara Marble floors and a Kallista Circ Claw Foot bathtub. Within the remaining territory of this 10,000 square foot home, it contains the following spaces: a library, ball room, billiard room, card room, laundry room, catering kitchen, dining room, and a detached 2 story carriage house which was built adjacent to the primary residence at the time of construction. The carriage house provided 4 horse stalls and carriage storage on its first floor, with hay storage and chutes located on the upper floor.
