= Rucker Brothers =

Pioneers of Everett, Washington, United States

Brothers Wyatt J. Rucker (1857–1931) and Bethel J. Rucker (1862–1945) were pioneering entrepreneurs who helped to found the city of Everett, Washington.

Originally from Noble County, Ohio, in 1888 the Rucker brothers moved to Tacoma, Washington, along with their mother Jane Morris Rucker (1830–1907). The following year they moved 60 miles (97 km) north to the Port Gardner peninsula, the site that would become Everett. The Ruckers purchased most of the land on the peninsula with plans to create a port and city there. They hoped that the site, near the mouth of the Snohomish River, would attract the Great Northern Railway, which was then building track toward Puget Sound.

The Ruckers were soon followed by Tacoma lumberman and investor Henry Hewitt, Jr. who had similar ambitions. Hewitt had lined up a group of wealthy investors, led by Charles Colby and Colgate Hoyt and backed by John D. Rockefeller. With their capital he formed the Everett Land Company, which began investing in land, construction, and other business needed by a new city. The Ruckers became partners in the company, selling about half of their land and retaining the rest.

Speculation in Everett was intense, and the new city was built quickly, but the boom turned to bust when it was announced that the Great Northern would establish its West Coast terminus at Seattle instead of Everett. The Rucker brothers survived the economic downturn, and when Rockefeller and his colleagues were ready to divest themselves of their failed investment, the Ruckers helped arrange the deal by which the Everett Land Company's interests were sold to a new entity, the Everett Improvement Company, controlled by the Great Northern's James J. Hill. Wyatt Rucker became treasurer of the new company.

== Everett and Monte Cristo Railway ==
Prosperity returned to Everett around 1900, and the Rucker brothers were among the city's leading citizens, with extensive investments in local real estate, banks, and other ventures. Among these ventures was the Rucker Brothers Timber Company, which operated a sawmill in nearby Lake Stevens and several timber camps to the east. These were serviced by the former Everett and Monte Cristo Railway, a line which had been built to access a large mining operation at Monte Cristo, high in the Cascade Mountains to the east.

The mine and the railway were another speculative venture by Colby and Hoyt, financed by Rockefeller. When it, too, proved unprofitable, Rockefeller withdrew his investment, and in 1903 the railway came into the possession of the Northern Pacific Railway. The Ruckers then leased the line from Northern Pacific and ran it under the name Hartford Eastern (named for Hartford, a small town near Lake Stevens). Their primary interest was in servicing their own timber operations, but they also provided cargo and passenger service to others.

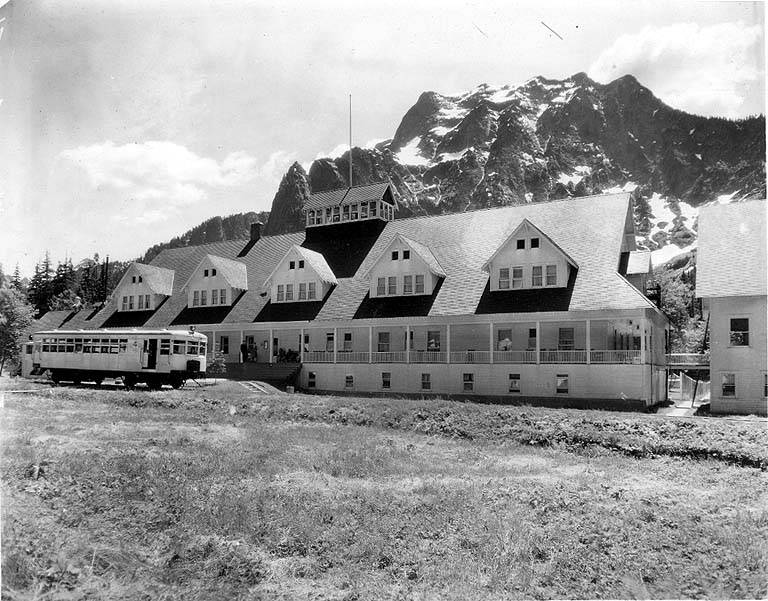
Big Four Inn with rail car

The scenic mountain railway became popular with tourists from Everett, some of whom stayed at the Ruckers' hotel in the mining town of Silverton, Washington. Inspired by this, the Ruckers built a grand upscale mountain resort, the Big Four Inn (named for the nearby Big Four Mountain), completed in 1921. The Inn was well supplied with modern amenities and featured a nine-hole golf course, tennis courts, and an artificial lake. The Inn prospered, but the railway remained a financial burden on the Ruckers. It became worse in 1925 when their lease expired and the Ruckers were forced to purchase the line from the Northern Pacific. In 1929, they sold the railway. The Big Four Inn was sold as well, and changed ownership several times before it was destroyed by fire in 1949.

== Legacy ==
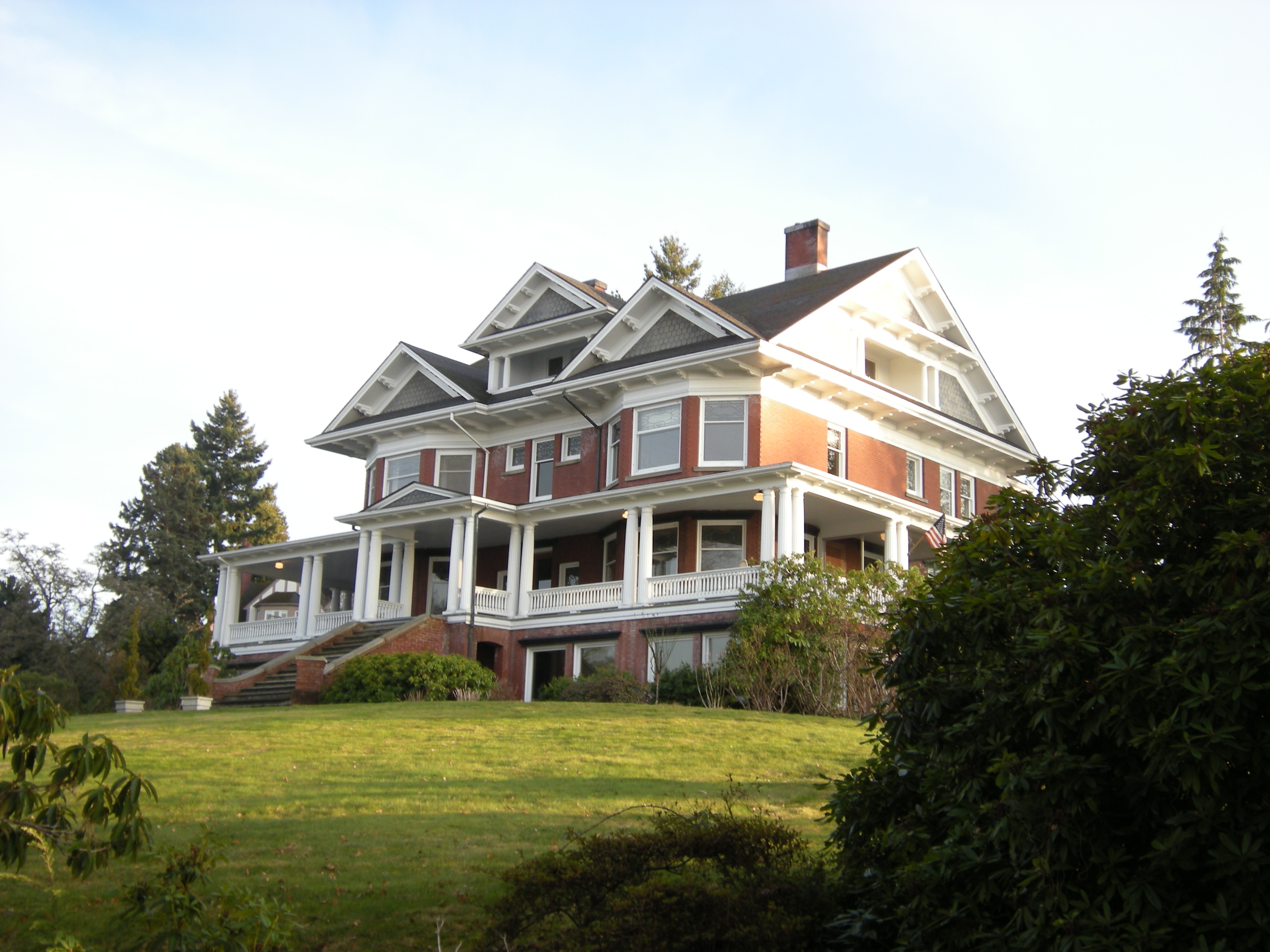
The Rucker mansion in Everett, Washington

A major thoroughfare in Everett is named Rucker Avenue.

The Rucker mansion, a three-story, 7,800-square-foot (720 m^{2}) brick home built on a hill overlooking Puget Sound (412 Laurel Drive, Everett), was added to the National Register of Historic Places in 1975. Legend says that the home, completed in 1905, was a present for Bethel's bride, Ruby Brown, whom he had married the year before, but it also served as home for several additional members of the family. The house is currently a privately owned residence.

Members of the Rucker family are buried in Evergreen Cemetery in Everett, where they are memorialized by the Rucker Monument, a 30-foot (9.1 m) granite pyramid commissioned by Wyatt and Bethel in 1907 to honor their mother.

== In popular culture ==
Musician Jason Webley and several other collaborators produced a live performance with invited musicians and a later album entitled Margaret (2014), which was inspired by and memorializes Margaret Rucker, an accomplished poet and daughter of Bethel Rucker. She is also interred in the Rucker pyramid.
