= Everett and Monte Cristo Railway =

Railway from the Cascade Mountains to Everett, Washington, US

- Logo Used From 1902 to 1903

Overview
- Headquarters: Everett, Washington
- Dates of operation: 1892–1936
- Successor: Northern Pacific Railway

Technical
- Track gauge: Standard gauge
- Length: 42 miles

The Everett and Monte Cristo Railway was built to transport gold and silver ores from mines in the central Cascade Mountains to a smelter in Everett, Washington. After the first mining claims were staked in 1889, entrepreneurs began exploring the possibility of building a railroad to exploit the find. Construction began in April 1892 and the first train reached what became the town of Monte Cristo in August 1893. The mining boom ended in 1903. Poor ore quality and quantity played a role in the decline, but the failure of the railway to maintain service to Monte Cristo in the face of floods, landslides, winter snows, fires, and other disasters was also a factor in the collapse of the industry. Nonetheless, the railway hauled out approximately 300,000 tons of ore over the course of its operations.

The railroad found a second set of customers among the timber companies. Logging in Puget Sound began along the shore, where water transport to sawmills was inexpensive. By the early 1900s, however, much of the lowland forest had been cut. The Everett and Monte Cristo tracks gave access to large areas of virgin forest, so the railroad was used to move raw logs down to existing mills. As the railway pushed further into the woods, new sawmills and roof shingle mills were established, and finished lumber and shingles were also shipped out by train.

Tourism was a part of the business from the beginning of the railroad. The mountain scenery was then and still is an attraction. The first tourist excursion to Monte Cristo took place within days of completing the track. Weekend excursions with up to 500 passengers and a brass band took advantage of sunny summer days. A resort hotel, The Inn at Big Four, was opened in 1921 along the rail line for guests who wanted more than a day trip to the mountains.

Choosing the route for the railroad proved a fateful decision. Trying to save money on initial construction, the owners chose the shortest route between the mines and the smelter. This ran the tracks through the steep-sided Robe Canyon, in some places mere feet above the flood-prone South Fork of the Stilliguamish River. This five-mile stretch was costly to maintain and suffered repeated outages. Service was interrupted for hours to years at a time, stranding people, freight, and rail cars. There was never enough money for maintenance. Over time, revenue fell as the mines played out, the easy timber was cut, and the road network extended competition further into the mountains. The railroad lost money, but the final blow was the Great Depression, which collapsed demand for the forest products hauled by the line. Scheduled rail service was abandoned in 1933 and the tracks torn up in 1936. Today, much of the Mountain Loop Highway from Verlot to Barlow Pass runs on the abandoned railroad grade.

== Ownership history ==
Plan for the station at Monte Cristo dated 1892, likely one of Barlow's original drawings.

=== Rockefeller years (1892–1902) ===
Prospector Joseph Pearsall staked the first claim in what was to become Monte Cristo on July 4, 1889. Word of his find set off a minor gold rush and dozens of mining claims were filed in the area. None of them had any real prospect of exploitation because there was nothing but a crude trail into the mining district, insufficient for hauling in mining equipment, construction materials, food, and other supplies, and hauling out ore to a smelter. A consortium of Northwest mining interests led by Fred Wilmans and Judge Hiram Bond, bought out many of the claims and began to explore bringing in a railroad. The Wilmans-Bond group hired John Q. Barlow to survey possible routes. He discovered what came to be known as Barlow Pass which connected the Monte Cristo district to the South Fork of the Stillaguamish River. The pass offered the shortest route to the Puget Sound lowlands and was ultimately adopted as the route of the Everett and Monte Cristo Railway.

At roughly the same, New York investment bankers Charles Colby and Colgate Hoyt, both of whom served on the Northern Pacific Railway's executive committee, were looking for ways to profit from their railroad's terminus on Puget Sound. They allied with Henry Hewitt to develop the town and port of Everett on Port Gardner Bay. The Colby-Hoyt investment syndicate was approached by the Wilmans-Bond mining group to build the railroad to Everett. An agreement was struck between the two groups committing the mines to produce a minimum amount of ore for 15 years and the railroad to ship it out at a fixed price. Fortuitously for the venture, Hoyt was friends with oil magnate John D. Rockefeller who provided the funding not only for the railroad, but also the Puget Sound Reduction Company's Everett smelter, the United Concentration Company's Monte Cristo ore concentrator, and a host of other investments in the area. As a result of the agreement between the two syndicates, The Everett and Monte Cristo Railway Company was incorporated on March 14, 1892. Construction began almost immediately.

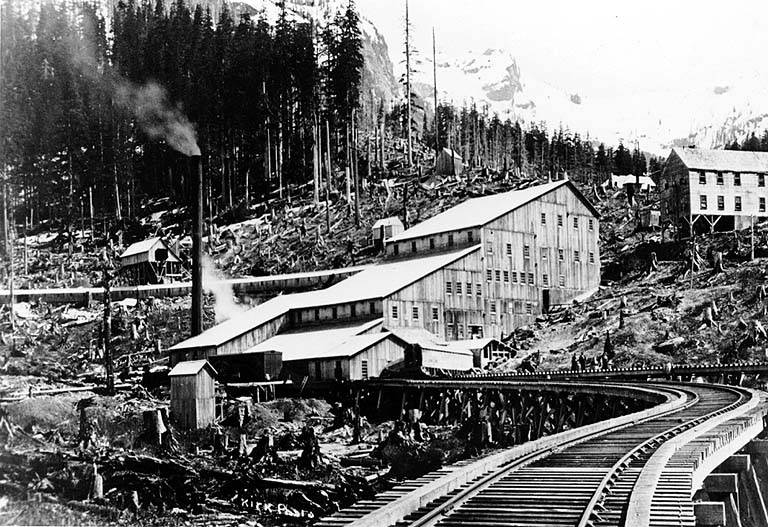
The Rockefeller-owned ore concentrator at Monte Cristo in 1894. The track in the foreground is the spur to the concentrator.

Another railroad consortium, this time funded by local businessmen, founded the Snohomish, Skykomish, and Spokane Railway and Transportation Company on April 19, 1889. The "Three S", as it came to be known was intended to lure the western terminus of the Great Northern Railway to Everett by meeting the line as it emerged from the Cascade Mountains. The Three S obtained its right-of-way from Snohomish to Everett and began construction in 1891. The road laid at least 4.75 miles of track before running out of money in March 1892. The Colby-Hoyt group swooped in and bought the company for the Everett and Monte Cristo Railway Company for $400,000.

The Panic of 1893 hurt businesses and railroads all over the country. Compounding the challenges for the Everett and Monte Cristo, in June 1893, the British House of Commons issued a recommendation that Her Majesty's Indian mints no longer produce silver rupees. World silver prices fell from 80 cents per ounce to 64 cents per ounce almost immediately, and never returned to the higher price during the time Rockefeller owned the railroad. This hurt the Monte Cristo investment. By 1894, Rockefeller had invested $1,797,000 in the railroad, and another $772,000 in mines, the concentrator, and smelter. To put this in context, America's richest man was worth $42 million at the time. All of these mining-related businesses were losing money. He dispatched Frederick T. Gates, a trusted advisor, to investigate and take action. This began a decade-long struggle to recoup the investment.

The winter storms of 1897 that washed out the tracks ended rail service to the mining district for three years. The mines, the concentrator, and the smelter all shut down, causing further financial stress among the owners. Rockefeller, who had loaned money to several of the mines, foreclosed on their mortgages and took control of the failed companies in January 1899. This gave him complete control of all aspects of the Monte Cristo operations from mine to smelter. At least one newspaper opined that Rockefeller had purposefully decided not to repair the railroad so as to pressure the miners into this very outcome. After the floods of 1897, however, the railway had survey crews on the ground seeking a better route to Monte Cristo, suggesting that the Rockefeller team had legitimate questions about the wisdom of investing yet more money in treacherous Robe Canyon.

As Rockefeller struggled recover his investment, the Northern Pacific Railway wanted its own track into Everett to compete more effectively with the Great Northern Railway. A deal was struck and the Northern Pacific bought the Western Division of the Everett and Monte Cristo, previously the Three S tracks, from Everett to where they connected to its existing tracks at Snohomish on February 4, 1900. The price was $750,000. As part of the deal. the Everett and Monte Cristo Railway maintained the right to run its trains over these tracks. After the sale, the Everett and Monte Cristo Railway Company was reorganized. New officers were elected and the company was renamed The Monte Cristo Railway Company on August 29, 1900.

As the new century began, Gates and the Rockefeller interests had three related properties to dispose of. The first was the smelter in Everett, the second was the mines and concentrator in Monte Cristo, and the third was the railway that connected them. In March 1900, the railroad announced plans to rebuild all the way to Monte Cristo. No rationale was provided for the new investment, but it followed the collapse of a potential sale of the Rockefeller assets to German industrialists. Rockefeller may have concluded that it would not be possible the sell his Northwest businesses unless they were operating. No one would buy the railroad unless the mines were shipping ore, providing a revenue stream, and no one would buy the mines unless the railroad could haul ore to the smelter. In any case, the line was repaired as quickly as possible. He sold the renewed Monte Cristo Railway Company to the Northern Pacific Railway on September 16, 1902 for $512,412.89. He lost over $2 million on the sale, but achieved the long-term goal of exiting the money-losing investment. After the acquisition, the route became the Monte Cristo branch of the Northern Pacific Railway.

=== Northern Pacific years (1902–1915) ===
The Northern Pacific invested heavily in the line in 1903 to improve the tracks in order to serve Rockefeller's mines better. He had other plans. He sold the smelter, the mines, and the ore concentrator to Meyer Guggenheim's ASARCO trust in September 1903. ASARCO bought the package in part to reduce competition from the Everett plant with its smelter in Tacoma. It had little interest in the mines and closed them at the end of 1903, significantly impacting the revenue of the Monte Cristo line.

With the drop in revenue, the Northern Pacific began to cut costs and defer maintenance on the line. The modern rotary snowplow that kept the line open in the winter was moved to other areas leading to long closures in the winter. The passenger cars went to the midwest for the Louisiana Purchase Exposition. When the roof on the turntable at Monte Cristo collapsed under heavy snow in 1904 it was never rebuilt. Rock slides in Robe Canyon caused outages almost every winter, and with the reduced traffic, the Northern Pacific saw less reason to repair the damage. The Monte Cristo line had become a problem for the Northern Pacific, just as it had for Rockefeller.

=== Rucker years (1915–1929) ===
The Rucker brothers, Wyatt and Bethel, were involved in a range of Everett businesses at the turn of the century. Both were active in banking and logging. They owned thousands of acres of forest land, and two sawmills. They employed 400 people in logging and in lumber mills. They were dependent upon the Monte Cristo line for their timber business, and had negotiated a series of annual contracts with the Northern Pacific for its use. When it came time to renew the agreement for 1915, the railroad refused. Instead, it offered to lease the entire road to the Ruckers for ten years. In order to secure their transport, they formed the Hartford and Eastern Railway Company and took over responsibility from the Northern Pacific in 1915. At the end of their 10-year lease, the Northern Pacific had even less interest in the Monte Cristo line and refused to renew the arrangement. The Ruckers bought the line In 1925 in order to keep the Northern Pacific from closing it.

The Hartford and Eastern, however, had as much trouble making money on the line as the Northern Pacific and Rockefeller before them. The railroad began losing money immediately after the purchase. In August 1929, the Ruckers sold the Hartford and Eastern to Puget Sound Pulp & Timber Company, along with the associated Inn at Big Four, their Lake Stevens sawmill, and 4,000 acres of timber land.

=== Logging Road (1929–1936) ===
Puget Sound Pulp and Timber was an integrated forest products company. It owned another short-line logging railroad, the Puget Sound Cascade Railway, near Clear Lake, Washington. It cut trees, hauled them on its railroad, and operated the pulp mill to turn its wood into paper. On the surface, the Hartford and Eastern, with the associated timber lands sold by the Ruckers, was a good fit for Puget Sound Pulp and Paper. Its timing, however, was exquisitely bad. The Great Depression began two months after the railroad was purchased. Demand for its products collapsed and the company lost money in 1930 and 1931. It defaulted on its bond interest in 1932. An agreement with the bond syndicate cut the company in half. In exchange for their bonds, the creditors received the Hartford and Eastern and the rest of the former Rucker assets, a pulp mill in Everett, and a small amount of cash.

The bondholders formed the Soundview Pulp Company to receive the assets and on July 19, 1932 the Hartford and Eastern was transferred to its new owner. As the depression deepened, Soundview Pulp worked hard to conserve what little cash it had. The railroad continued to lose money and there was a growing list of repairs to be made as snow, floods, and rockslides continued to cause problems for it. The company filed an application with the Interstate Commerce Commission to abandon the line which was granted on April 22, 1933. By 1936 the rails were gone, too, ending even sporadic service.

== Route ==
In order to move ore from the mines in Monte Cristo to the smelter in Everett in 1894, a train would travel on three different sections of track. It would begin its journey from Monte Cristo to Hartford Junction on the tracks of the "Eastern Division" of the Everett and Monte Cristo Railway. From Hartford Junction to Snohomish it would use the track of the Seattle, Lakeshore, and Eastern Railway, which later was acquired by the Northern Pacific Railway. From Snohomish to the smelter complex in Everett, it would switch to the "Western Division" of the Everett and Monte Cristo track, the previous Snohomish, Skykomish, and Spokane Railway which had been acquired in 1892.

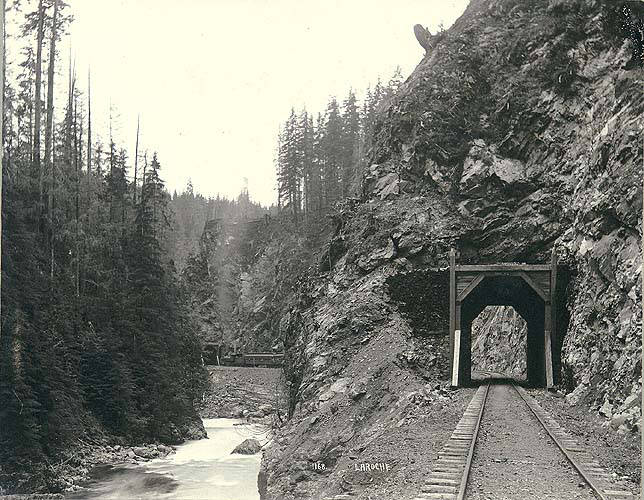
Robe Canyon tunnel #5 in 1894

Traveling east from Hartford Junction, on the Eastern Division, the Everett and Monte Cristo reached the town of Granite Falls after traversing relatively moderate terrain for some 6 miles. There was a two-story depot in Granite Falls. Just east of town, the tracks followed the South Fork of the Stillaguamish River into Robe Canyon, which was so steep-sided that six tunnels had to be dug in just two miles (a seventh tunnel, closer to Monte Cristo, was dug, collapsed, and was abandoned). Tunnel cave-ins became so problematic that the roofs of tunnels #2 and #4 were dynamited off, turning them into cuts open to the sky. Three bridges crossed the Stilliguamish as the right of way sought easier ground on one side of the river or another.

Past Robe Canyon, and 29 miles beyond Hartford Junction, the railway reached Silverton, which developed as a secondary mining center along the line. It also had a depot. Three miles further on, the line reached the site of the Inn at Big Four. At 38 miles east of Hartford Junction, the route reached Barlow Pass and left the Stilliquamish drainage. The railroad built a snow shed there. At 42 miles the end of the line was reached in Monte Cristo. At this terminus there was a hand-operated turntable, rail yard, water tank, a small engine house, and a passenger depot. A spur line led to the concentrator for the collection of ore.

Along the route were various spurs used by mines, lumber mills, farms, and other commercial enterprises. An 1,800' sidetrack served the Cypher's and Stinson's logging camp near Granite Falls.

== Construction ==
John Barlow was sent out with survey teams in February 1892 to finalize the location of the railroad. Grading for the railroad along Barlow's route began in April 1892, shortly after the company was incorporated. The work of building the railway was given to a number of contractors. Bowman and Paine had 150 men working on its four-mile part of the road, and wanted more men. Smith and Brothers had 320 men for its section of the railway. In May, just a month after the company was founded between 500 and 600 men were working on the Everett and Monte Cristo line. At the peak of construction in 1892, about 1,500 men were working on various aspects of the project. There were never enough men. Want ads were placed in newspapers throughout the region. An ad in San Francisco called for 1000 workers at wages of $2.25 per day.

Part of the reason more men were needed was because the work was difficult and dangerous, causing many to quit. Working in rain and snow was fairly routine. There was a lot of blasting and then the laborious process of hauling away the rubble in wheelbarrows. There were very few power tools, so most of the work was pure manual labor. While some rock in the canyon was solid, other parts were piles of loose debris. Tunneling through this material caused one cave-in after another; the railroad had to abandon its tunnel #7 completely. The work could also be fatal. The walls of Robe Canyon were so steep that men would lash themselves to trees so they would not fall into the river while working. In August 1893, a premature blast started a landslide that swept a dozen men to their deaths in the Stillaguamish, unable to escape their ropes. In the same month, another laborer, Dick Mahoney, was crushed to death by a falling tree near Monte Cristo.

The camps in which the railroad men found themselves were legally dry as the Snohomish County Commission decided not to approve any liquor licenses along the route. Legalisms notwithstanding, saloons and gambling dens sprang up along the line to provide amusement to the workers in the railroad camps. Many of these were immigrants with poor English language skills and they were, or perceived they were cheated at some of these establishments. Joe Monaghan's saloon was razed by an outraged party of railroad men in retaliation on September 6, 1892. Ill feeling also extended between the workers and their bosses. Reuters reported that on June 17, 1892 four Italian workers in the Smith and Brothers camp killed their foreman, and were subsequently lynched by 60 "white" men while 150 Italians looked on. Subsequent reports cast doubt on this story, but there is no doubt that there were ethnic tensions in the camps.

The first rails for the Everett and Monte Cristo arrived on July 10, 1892 on thirteen Northern Pacific freight cars. These were intended to finish the Western Division, the previous Three S right of way. Over 5,000 tons of rails, fishplates, and spikes were shipped from eastern manufacturers on three sailing ships for the Eastern Division. All of them took longer to make the journey than expected. As a result, much of the initial clearing, grading, tunneling, and bridging on the Eastern Division was accomplished by hauling supplies on a corduroy road using pack animals. The road was hacked out of the forest by a party of 75 men. The first of the three ships to arrive was the smallest, the bark Guy C. Goss. She began discharging her cargo of rails on July 26, 1892. Track laying began immediately but, since the ship held only a tenth of the material, was suspended when supplies ran low. Abner Coburn took 174 days to sail around Cape Horn from New York, arriving November 1, 1892. By the time she moored in Everett, almost the entire grade was complete. The third ship, Annie H. Smith, had the worst trip of the three. She was forced by blown-out sails and a damaged rudder to retreat from Cape Horn to Stanley, Falkland Islands for repairs. Having sailed from New York on April 30, she finally reached Puget Sound in late November 1892.

By the end of August 1892, the grading to Monte Cristo was almost complete and 500' of the 816' tunnel #1 was bored. Track laying had reached the first crossing of the Stilliguamish, just below the entrance to tunnel #1. The rapid progress came to a halt when heavy rains in September 1892 washed out portions of the new railroad. Construction was delayed by at least a month as repairs were made and then the snows began in earnest. In the Spring, once through the canyon and in the better weather, track was laid at the rate of a half-mile a day. By mid-June 1893 track had reached the second bridge over the Stilliquamish. The first train reached Monte Cristo in August 1893.

== Operating history ==
=== Boom years (1893–1897) ===
Train service began between Everett and Snohomish, on April 11, 1893. Monday through Saturday service to Monte Cristo began in September 1893. In December this schedule was reduced to three trains a week, but thanks to the use of a modern steam-powered snowplow, the tracks to Monte Cristo were kept open all winter. Among the early cargos carried to Monte Cristo were mining equipment and the ore concentrator machinery. The concentrator was completed in mid-February 1894, and by August hopper cars of ore were finally headed out of Monte Cristo, bound for the smelter in Everett. Mines in Silverton also began shipping ore in 1894. In 1895 every train carried 6 to 8 car loads of ore from the mountains. In the first two weeks of February 1897, 24 cars of concentrates shipped from Monte Cristo. By April 1897, 40 hopper cars carrying 1,000 tons of ore were shipped in a week. This was approximately the peak of production, both in quantity and quality. The quality of the ore declined the further miners went into the mountains.

The logging business was also booming for the railroad. Raw logs, some seventeen feet in diameter, rode to sawmills, and finished lumber was transported to the world. In the Fall of 1894, the railroad was contracted by local logging companies to run a line to a new log dump north of Everett. The steamer Utopia brought 50 tons of rails for this new line in October. In August 1895, 100 cars of shingles shipped out of the woods, a record for the railroad. New spurs were planned for more mills and logging camps. Even the bark stripped off by the lumber companies was valuable. In 1895, a contract from a tannery called for 100 cords of bark per week to be shipped from Silverton.

Tourism grew along with mining and timber shipments. In September 1893, within days of the line's completion, a Sunday excursion train ran from Everett to Monte Cristo. The train left at 7:30 AM and reached Monte Cristo at 10:30 AM. Passengers reboarded at 3:30 PM and were home by 7:30 PM. The cost of the round trip was $2.50 per passenger. Private excursions were also arranged. In August 1895, the railroad treated 200 members of the Washington State Press Association to a trip to Monte Cristo. One reporter who went to Monte Cristo on an excursion in July 1894 reported that the train stopped in Robe Canyon to let off a couple of fisherman who wanted to try their luck in the Stilliquamish. Four hours later, on the way back to Everett, the train stopped again to pick up the two and their 115 new-caught trout.

While the railway made progress commercially, natural disasters were a constant threat to operations. Heavy rains in November 1893 flooded portions of the railway from the lowlands all the way to the new station yard in Monte Cristo and threatened at least one of the Stilliguamish bridges. November 1896 brought heavy snows that piled up in the mountains. Temperatures rose in mid-November and warm winds melted the snow, quickly flooding the valleys and lowlands. The Everett and Monte Cristo tracks were closed for weeks while the company worked to repair the line. Hundreds of miners and other residents walked out of Monte Cristo when food and other supplies ran short. It was February 1897 before the rails reached Monte Cristo again and daily train passenger service did not restart until April 26.

The railroad's business came to a halt again in November 1897 when rainstorms pushed the Stillaguamish River out of its banks. This time the destruction closed the line from the Granite Falls all the way to Monte Cristo. The floods swept away bridges, ballast, and rails alike, leaving no trace of the railroad in some areas. In Robe Canyon, the Stilliguamish rose until it flowed through tunnel #6. One eyewitness said that the river rose thirty feet above its normal level, and that the "rails were broken as if they were glass or bent into all sorts of fantastic shapes". An engine and several passenger and freight cars were stranded in Monte Cristo. With the loss of rail service, the town began to run out of food. Men, women, and children hiked out in the rain and snow to avoid starving. Some estimated that it would take $1 million to rebuild the line and others speculated that it would be closed forever. In mid-December, General Manager J. R. Crooker and President Frederick Gates, announced that since the mines and railroad were losing money, the washed out sections would not be rebuilt. One newspaper headline put it succinctly; without the railroad, "Monte Cristo Dead".

=== Waiting for repairs (1897–1903) ===
After the flood of 1897, the railroad continued to run trains between Everett and Granite Falls. Without the Everett and Monte Cristo, however, everything further to the east was cut off. The mines and the timber operations were closed. The Colby-Hoyt mines at Monte Cristo went bankrupt. The railroad was not in a hurry to rebuild past Granite Falls, as it was after the 1896 floods. As 1898 began the railroad had survey teams examining a number of alternate routes to avoid Robe Canyon. None of them were pursued. The railroad did repair the track as far as tunnel #2 in order to service the lime kiln that had begun shipping in 1897. By mid-1899 the temporary repairs had pushed through Robe Canyon to recover five full cars of shingles from the mill at Robe, but there was no commitment to rebuild the line permanently.

Once Rockefeller decided to spend the money it took to repair the line in March 1900, progress was quick. On May 19, 1900 the first train since the 1897 floods reached Silverton. Repairs reached Monte Cristo shortly thereafter and the mines and lumber mills along the line were reopened. Tourist excursions began again. Though the repairs were pushed ahead with speed, they were made to last. The three bridges over the Stilliguamish were raised. Concrete retaining walls were poured in Robe Canyon to protect the roadbed from the river. In some parts of the canyon, the rails were embedded in concrete to prevent the river from sweeping them away.

The Northern Pacific continued the work to improve the line after its purchase in 1902. It poured yet more concrete to protect the rails in Robe Canyon, filled in some smaller trestles, straightened some curves, and enlarged culverts under the roadbed. The Northern Pacific kept up on routine maintenance as well, clearing the tracks of the many small avalanches and fallen trees. For example, on December 31, 1902 a rock slide covered the track between tunnel #1 and tunnel #2 for 200 feet to a depth of 20 feet. A train bound for Everett was trapped on the eastern side of the closure. The passengers spent most of New Years Day in the train while the tracks were cleared. All the investment was for naught. In late 1903 Rockefeller sold his mines to ASARCO which closed them, eliminating the largest potential source of revenue for the railroad.

=== Quiet years (1904–1915) ===
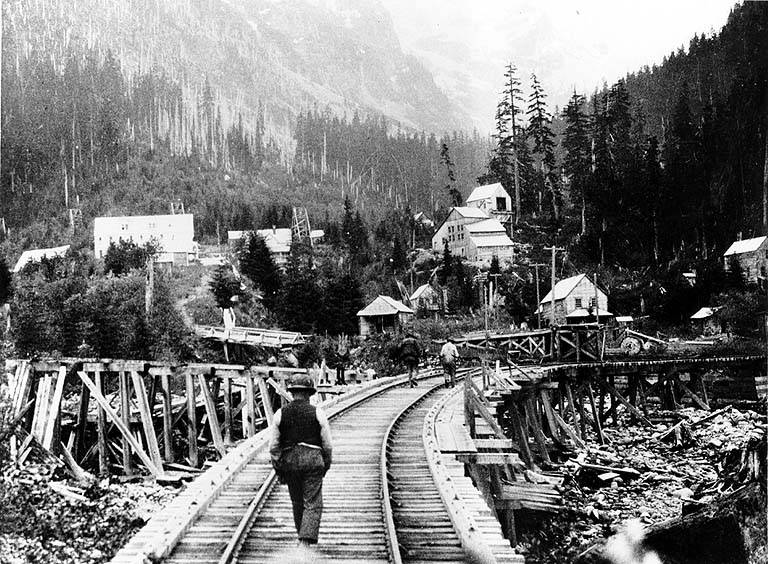
Main line into Monte Cristo, ca. 1919. Boston-American concentrator in background. The decrepit trestle to the left is the old spur to the original concentrator.

After acquiring the Monte Cristo Railway, the new owners at the Northern Pacific moved its modern rotary snow plow to the transcontinental line crossing the Cascades. Thereafter, winter service to Monte Cristo became irregular or non-existent. In 1904, a month went by without any train service. When a plow was finally procured to reopen the tracks in April, snow was found to be five feet deep.

Smaller mines that had been independent of the Rockefeller interests tried to operate but it was 1907, almost four years after ASARCO closed its mines, before the next car of ore was shipped on the Monte Cristo line. A series of other mining investments, some reworking the old Rockefeller mines, and others tunneling into new areas came and went, always ending in bankruptcy. The Boston-American Mining Company went so far as to build a new concentrator at Monte Cristo, but it, too, failed before shipping any ore.

While traffic on the railway was down from the boom years, natural hazards continued at their usual pace. In January 1907, sparks from a passing locomotive set fire to the timber lining of tunnel #1. Virtually the entire tunnel collapsed stranding an engine east of the blockage. Before the tunnel could be repaired, a landslide dumped 300 feet of debris 15 feet deep between tunnels #1 and #2. It took the Northern Pacific until late May to repair the damage and resume service. On February 18, 1908 a rock slide closed the tracks east of tunnel #1 for two months. In January 1909, another rockslide in Robe Canyon buried the tracks near tunnel #4. The pile was 200 feet long and 25 feet deep. It took a month to get the trains running again. In October 1910 tunnel #2 collapsed. The Northern Pacific put a crew of 100 men on the line to repair the damage, but it took until mid-October 1911 until the tracks were cleared to Robe. It was 1912 by the time trains reached Silverton. By 1913 unhappiness about the lack of service to Monte Cristo resulted in a complaint to the Washington Public Service Commission. The Commission held hearings on the matter, which forced the railroad and the miners into negotiations. The Northern Pacific agreed to repair the line for light gas cars to move men and supplies, and agreed to rebuild for heavy steam engines and hopper cars if the mines ever started producing. The first passenger train since 1908 reached Monte Cristo on July 26, 1914. These annual disasters and the costs they entailed were one of the factors that drove the Northern Pacific to lease the line to the Rucker Brothers.

=== Decline and end (1915–1936) ===
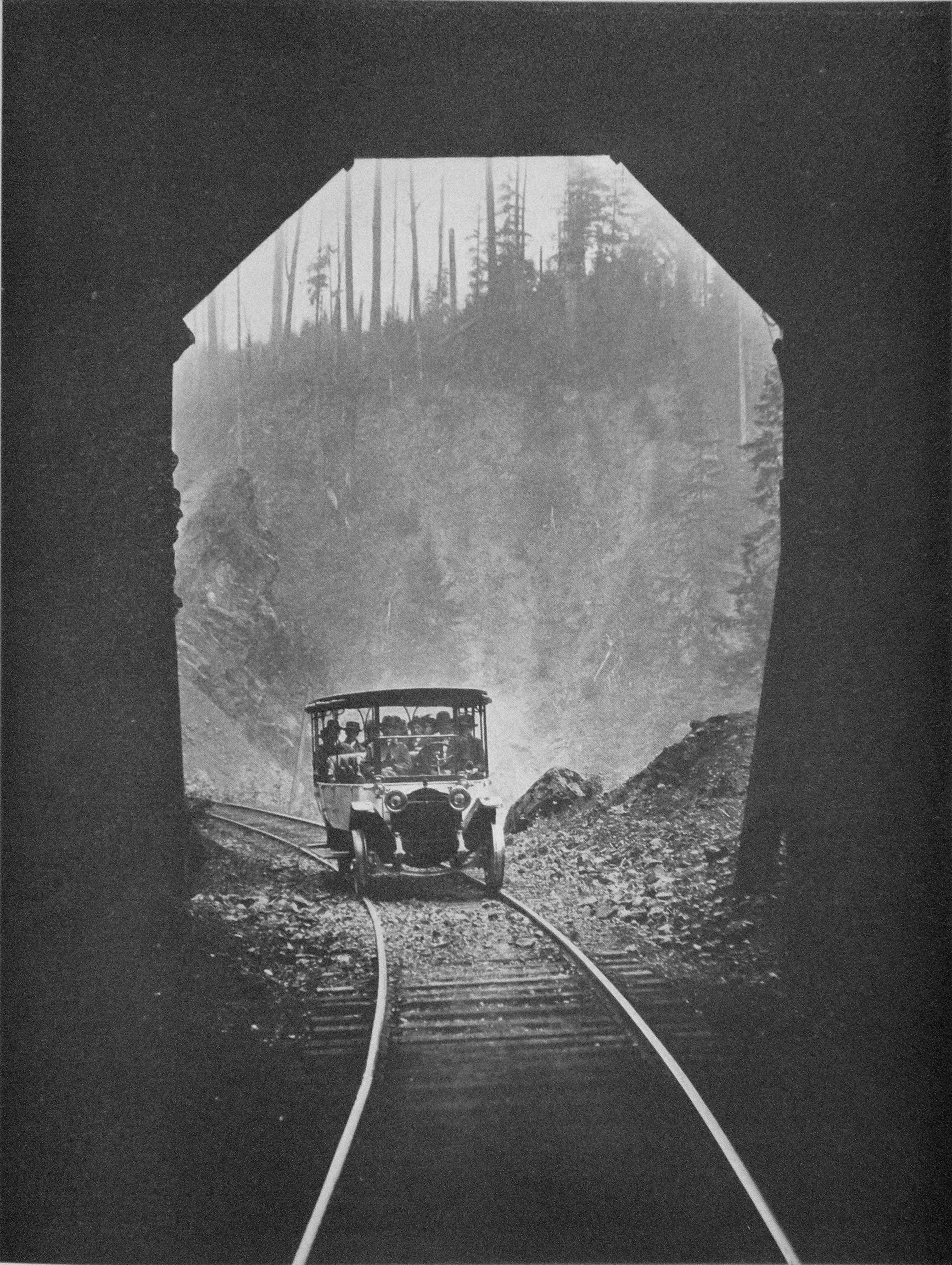
A gas car enters tunnel #3 in 1916

The Hartford and Eastern pursued tourist business with some success. Its gas cars took visitors to the snows of "Glacier Camp" to play in the summer snows, and for "unexcelled Sunday outings and fishing trips". A round-trip cost $1.50 with kids aged 5 to 12 going for half price. Larger outings were also organized, for example, the Mountaineers 1918 summer outing traveled up the Stilliguamish Valley by gas car. The Rucker brothers built the Inn at Big Four along the Hartford and Eastern line at Glacier Camp in 1921. It was an "up-to-date establishment" with each of the 50 rooms having its own bathroom, and electric lighting. It was a year-round resort. In the summer guests could walk along a boardwalk to visit the Big Four Ice Caves or shoot a round of golf on a nine-hole course. In the winter, the Hartford and Eastern used a small rotary snow plow to keep the tracks clear to the Inn. The Rucker's maintained a small ski operation at the site.

During the Winter of 1916 the Ruckers were introduced to the problems their predecessors had struggled with. Snow avalanches blocked the rails all along the route since the Ruckers had not yet procured a rotary plow. A number of mining and timber companies complained to the Washington Public Service Commission seeking an order to force the railroad to restore service. On October 17, 1917 the Commission ordered the railway to operate a sufficient number of trains to meet the demand for service to Monte Cristo and at least one train per week during the winter snows. It was not to be. In 1921 the Washington Department of Public Works filed a complaint against the railway because it was again closed by snow.

The mines were gone for good; no ore shipped from Monte Cristo after 1915. Timber shipments were 92% of the railroad's tonnage in 1930 and 1931. Even the volume of timber shipments rapidly declined after the onset of the Great Depression. In 1927 the railroad shipped 37,853 tons, while 1930 shipments dropped to 10,139 tons. The river continued to wash-out portions of the track, and landslides, snow and fallen trees periodically blocked the line. With revenue falling along with shipping volumes, there was no money to properly repair the tracks. Temporary fixes to trestles and bridges were the best that could be done, and the line became incapable of supporting heavy steam engines and conventional passenger and freight cars. Monte Cristo and Silverton were cut off for months and years at a time while the tracks waited for repairs. Eventually, the level of maintenance on the railway declined to the point where it was impossible to run even the tiny four-wheel gas "speeders" on portions of the line.

The abandonment order granted by the Interstate Commerce Commission relieved the Hartford and Eastern of its common carrier obligations. This effectively ended scheduled service. Soundview Pulp Company continued to run occasional trains to haul out timber, and local residents used speeders and even hand cars to travel on parts of the road that were still passable, but by 1933 there was less need for the railroad. A paved road reached Granite Falls and a gravel road extended to Verlot. In 1936 the rails were torn up and shipped to Japan for scrap ending all rail service on the line.

== Rolling stock ==
=== Everett And Monte Cristo Railway ===
The Everett and Monte Cristo had four steam locomotives:

- Locomotive #1 was a 4-6-0 purchased from Cooke Locomotive Works in June 1892. After the line was purchased by the Northern Pacific Railway, it was designated locomotive #366.
- Locomotive #2 was a 4-6-0 purchased from Cooke Locomotive Works in June 1892. It was identical to locomotive #1 and delivered only a week later. It became the Northern Pacific Railway locomotive #367.
- Locomotive #3 was a 4-6-0 purchased from Cooke Locomotive Works in 1893. Later it became the Northern Pacific Railway locomotive #368.
- Locomotive #4 was a 4-4-0 purchased used from the Union Pacific Railway. It later became Northern Pacific locomotive #632.

Locomotives #1 and #2 were shipped in pieces from Paterson, New Jersey and assembled in a Northern Pacific roundhouse. Locomotive #1 moved off under its own steam to help in the construction of its tracks on July 23, 1892. In addition to the four engines, in 1901 the Monte Cristo Railway had 21 box cars, 50 flat cars, 35 hopper cars, 3 cabooses, 1 rotary snow plow, 3 passenger cars, and 2 combination freight/passenger cars.

=== Hartford and Eastern Railway ===
In 1933, just prior to ceasing operations, the railway owned very little rolling stock. It leased one light steam locomotive, which was rarely used because both it and the tracks it ran on were in poor repair. It owned three gasoline-powered train cars which sat 21, 27, and 42 passengers. These "gas cars" might also pull a trailer or two. The line also owned two gasoline-powered "speeders", four-wheeled conveyances that might seat 5 to 7 passengers. The line owned no freight cars of any sort.

The Hartford and Eastern's last owner, Soundview Pulp Company, had some flat cars that were used to haul wood products along the line.

== Railroad legacy ==
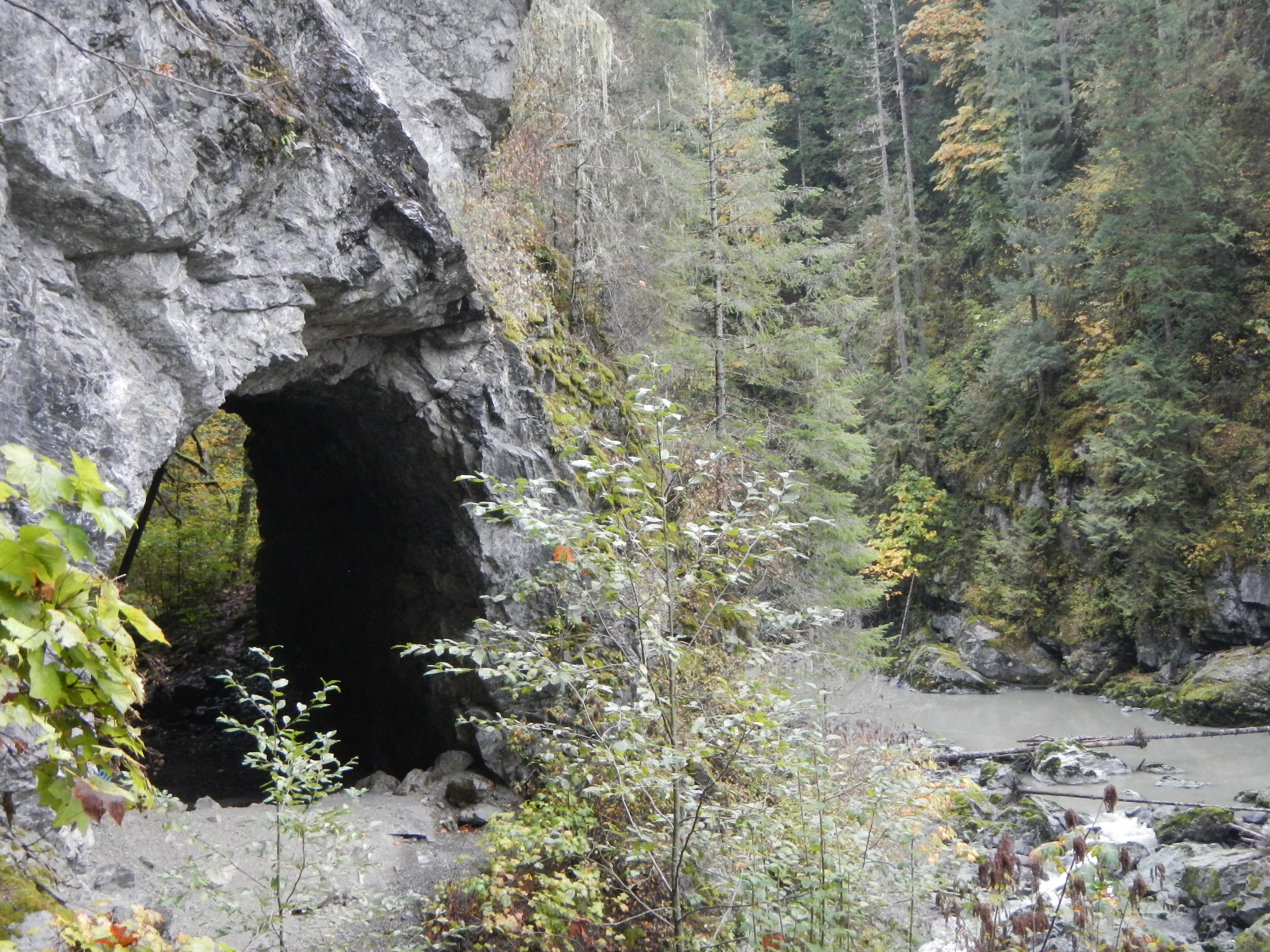
Robe Canyon tunnel #5 in 2018

Evidence of the Everett and Monte Cristo Railway can still be seen. Snohomish County created Robe Canyon Historic Park with two hiking trails that largely follow the old railway grade. The Lime Kiln Trail begins east of Granite Falls and follows the route east to where it crossed the South Fork of the Stilliguamish River for the first time. Here the railroad had a 150' Howe truss bridge just prior to entering tunnel #1. The bridge is long gone, so the trail stops at the river. Along the way it passes the site of a lime kiln which began shipping product on the railroad in 1897. The Old Robe Trail begins at the other end of Robe Canyon and works its way west, back toward Granite Falls. It follows the right of way to just before the entrance to tunnel #6. While the trail is officially closed beyond this point, some hikers have followed the route to beyond the site of tunnel #4. While there are few rails and ties remaining in situ, the concrete walls intended to protect the tracks from the river, and the concrete in which the ties were set are much in evidence as are tunnels #6, #5, and the cut at the site of tunnel #4. The natural hazards of the canyon that caused problems for the railroad are also still quite visible. In some places the roadbed is covered by landslides, while others have been washed away by the river. The exit to the cut at tunnel #4 is completely blocked by a rock slide.

When regular service on the Hartford and Eastern ended in 1933, area residents, businesses, and the U.S. Forest Service which administered the nearby public lands began a concerted effort to replace the railroad with an automobile road. The effort ultimately resulted in the Mountain Loop Highway. Going east from Granite Falls, the new highway went north of Robe Canyon avoiding the flooding and landslides that the trains contended with. However, the 20 miles of the Mountain Loop Highway between Verlot and Barlow Pass was built on the original railway grade, perhaps the most significant legacy of the Everett and Monte Cristo.

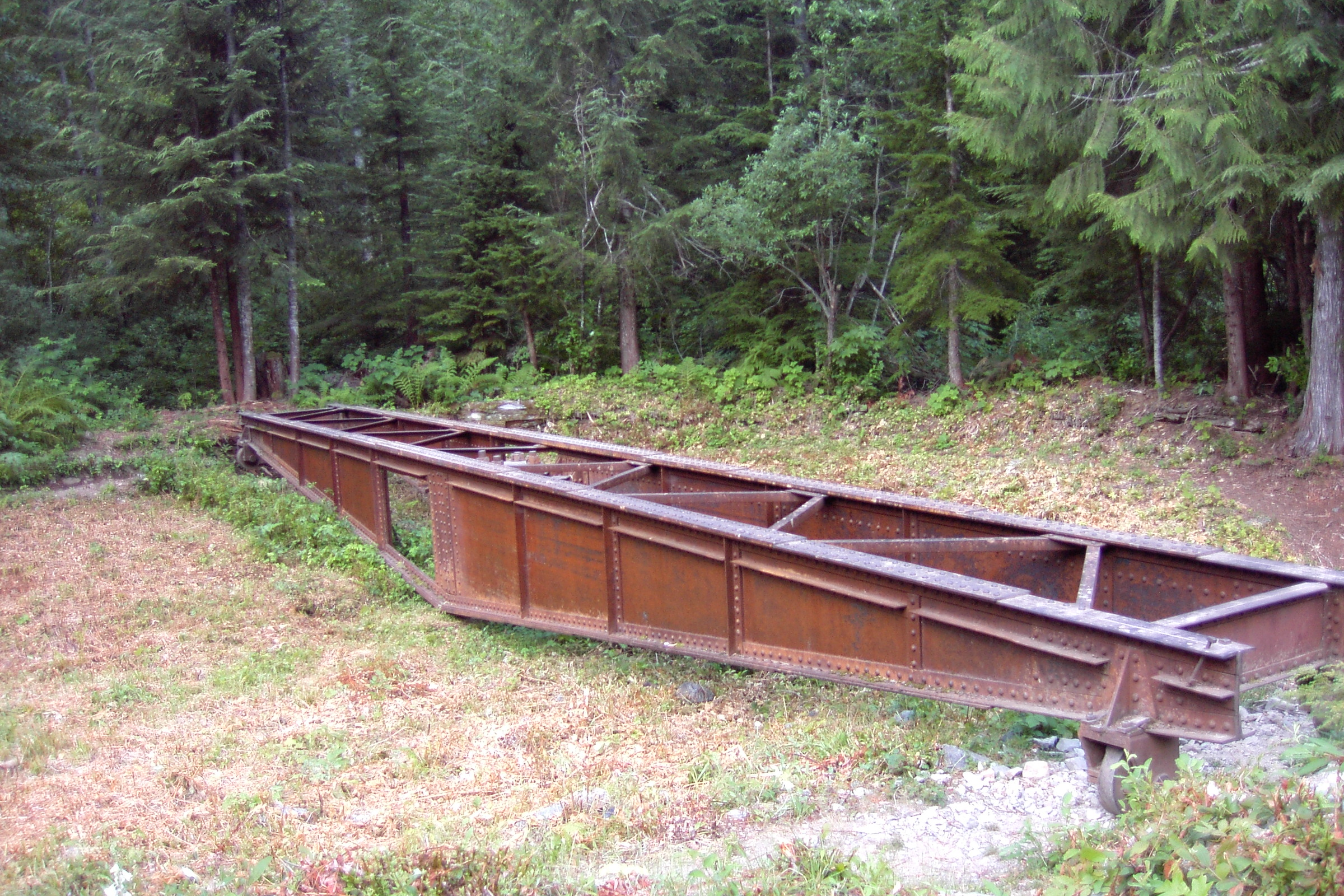
Turntable at Monte Cristo in 2003

Locomotives on the Everett and Monte Cristo Railway used a turntable in the Monte Cristo rail yard in order to change directions prior to heading back to Everett. The turntable was hand powered, and once had a roofed structure to keep the snow from interfering with its free movement. The turntable is the only part of the Monte Cristo rail yard that is still in place.

A final legacy of the railroad is the Big Four picnic area, maintained by the US Forest Service, at the site where the Inn at Big Four once stood. The inn burned to the ground on September 7, 1949. The only remnant is the massive double fireplace that once stood in the lobby.

=== Model railroading ===
The dramatic history and scenery of the Everett and Monte Cristo Railway has made it a subject for model railroaders. The line has been featured in several model railroading publications.
