= Lord Hill =

Lord Hill may refer to:

- Baron Hill, a title held by several people
- Viscount Hill, a title held by several people

== See also ==
- Lord Hill's Column in Shrewsbury, UK, named after 1st Viscount Hill
- Lord Hill Regional Park in Snohomish County, Washington, U.S.
- Lord Hill-Norton
