= Bald Hill (Snohomish County, Washington) =

Hill in Washington, United States

- Location within Washington (state)

Highest point
- Elevation: 737 ft (225 m)
- Prominence: 677 ft (206 m)
- Coordinates: 47°50′09″N 122°01′59″W

Geography
- Location: Near Monroe, Snohomish County, Washington
- Topo map: Maltby 1:24,000

Bald Hill is a 737-foot (225 m) hill in Snohomish County, Washington. The Skykomish River once flowed north of the hill but at some point in recent geologic history was diverted to its present course on the south side of the hill, moving the confluence with the Snoqualmie River (creating the Snohomish River) several miles upstream. In 1952, most of Bald Hill and adjacent Devils Butte were Washington State Forest land. As of 2016, Devils Butte is part of Lord Hill Regional Park, and the Bald Hill area was still listed by Washington State Department of Natural Resources as State Forest Trust, formerly Forest Board Trust land.
