= Baron Hill =

Baron Hill may refer to:

== People ==
- Baron Hill (politician) (born 1953), Representative for Indiana

=== Baronies ===
- Baron Hill, a subsidiary title of Viscount Hill
- Edward Hill, Baron Hill of Wivenhoe (Ted Hill, 1899–1969), British trade unionist and life peer
- Charles Hill, Baron Hill of Luton (1904–1989), British physician, politician, television executive and life peer
- Jonathan Hill, Baron Hill of Oareford (born 1960), British politician, EU Commissioner and life peer
- Baron Hill of Kilwarlin, subsidiary title of Marquess of Downshire
- Baron Hill of Olderfleet, subsidiary title of Viscount Dungannon

== Places ==
- Baron Hill, Anglesey, in Wales
- Barón Hill, a hill within the city of Valparaiso

== See also ==
- Hill (surname)
- All pages with titles containing "Baron Hill"
- Baron Hill-Norton
- Lord Hill (disambiguation)
