= Elizabeth Sherman Lindsay =

American landscape architect (1885–1954)

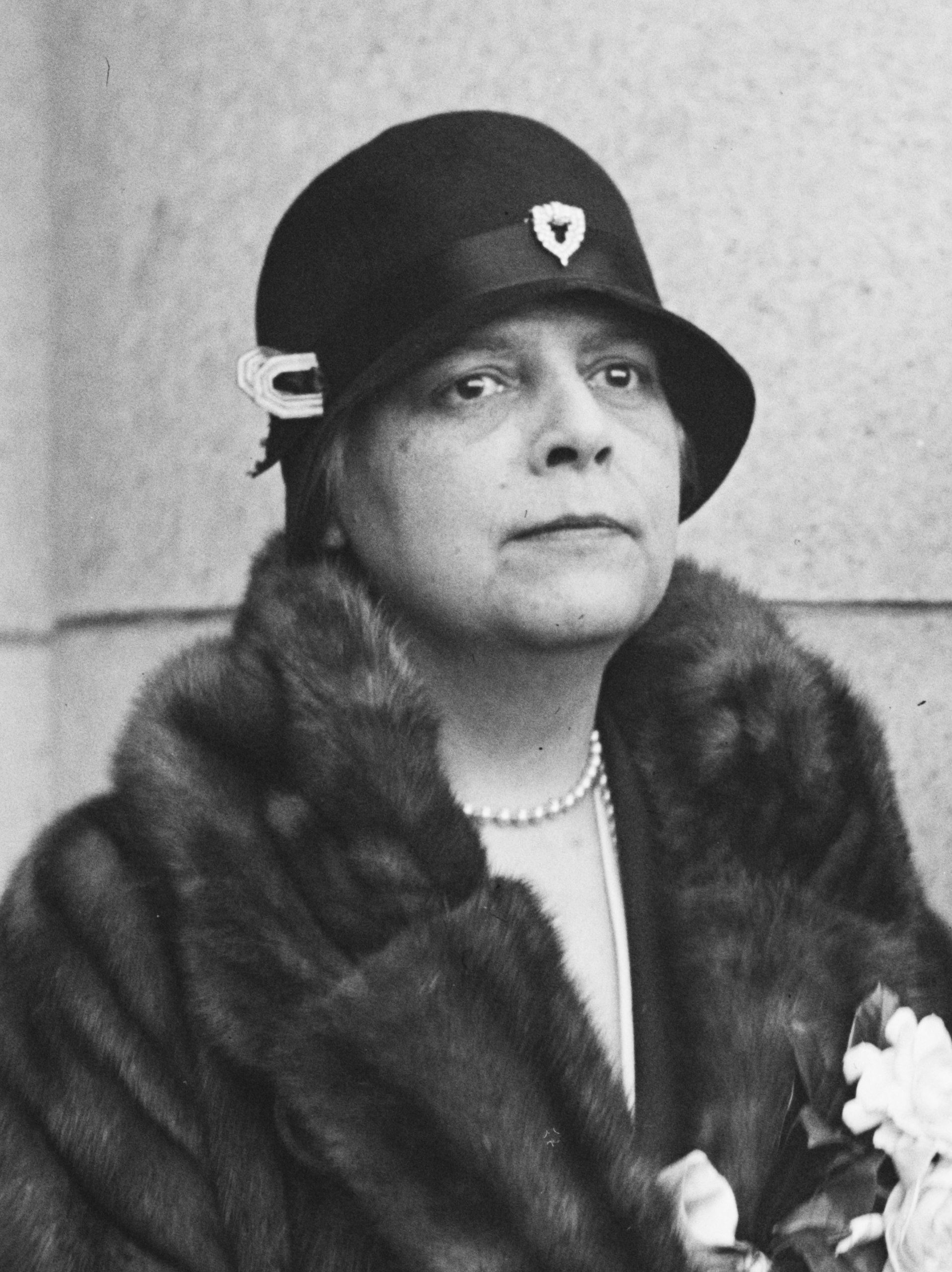
- Lindsay in 1930
- Born: Elizabeth Sherman Hoyt; 16 October 1885
- Died: 3 September 1954 (aged 68)
- Occupations: Landscape and Garden Designer
- Spouse: Ronald Lindsay (m. 1924; died 1945)

Elizabeth Sherman Lindsay (née Hoyt; 16 October 1885 – 3 September 1954) was an American landscape gardener and a Red Cross executive during the First World War. She was also the wife of British diplomat Sir Ronald Charles Lindsay.

== Biography ==
Elizabeth Sherman Hoyt married Sir Ronald Charles Lindsay in 1924. He was appointed Ambassador to Turkey from 1924 to 1926 and to Germany from 1926 to 1928, Permanent Under-Secretary of State for Foreign Affairs from 1928 to 1930 and Ambassador to the United States from 1930 to 1939. While in Washington D.C., Elizabeth Lindsay planted the gardens of the new Edwin Lutyens designed British Embassy which was the setting for the famous tea party for King George VI and his wife Queen Elizabeth, the first reigning monarchs from the United Kingdom to visit North America.

=== Early years ===
Lady Lindsay was born Elizabeth Sherman Hoyt, the daughter of the American financier and industrialist Colgate Hoyt (1849–1922); her mother, Lida Sherman, was the daughter of Charles Taylor Sherman and the niece of the Civil War general William Tecumseh Sherman and of John Sherman, who served as both Secretary of State as well as United States Secretary of the Treasury. The family home was "Eastover," a 173-acre estate on Centre Island, New York in Long Island. Hoyt's older and only siblings were Sherman, Ann and Colgate. Elizabeth Hoyt lived in Oyster Bay (town), New York with her brothers; Sherman became the first world-class American yachtsman.

Her mother, Lida, died 15 September 1908 after which Elizabeth developed heart problems. She managed "Eastover" until her father remarried, to Katherine Cheeseman.

=== Careers ===
Hoyt was educated at private schools in New York City. Beginning in 1909 for two seasons, determined to become a landscape architect at a time when formal training was not opened to women, Elizabeth Hoyt studied botany and horticulture at the Arnold Arboretum in Massachusetts, under the supervision of the head, Charles Sprague Sargent. Her role model and mentor was Beatrix Jones, who later became Beatrix Farrand, the designer of the gardens of Dumbarton Oaks.

She worked for two years in Jones's New York office. In October 1914, after touring and studying gardens both in Europe and the United States, Hoyt set up her own business in New York, first at 171 Madison Avenue, later at 38 East 11th Street. Work was mostly small commissions on Long Island's Gold Coast, Long Island (the North Shore) of Long Island, the area of her upbringing, and in Cleveland, Ohio, where members of her family still lived.

With the onset of World War I, Hoyt went to Washington and lived in the Lafayette Square, Washington, D.C. home of Henry Adams, the long-term friend and companion to her aunt, Elizabeth Sherman Cameron. She became an assistant to Martha Lincoln Draper at the headquarters of the American Red Cross. Draper and Hoyt were sent to France in July 1917 to undertake the standardization of hospital garment and dressings and to survey working conditions of women.

By October 1917, upon returning to the Red Cross headquarters in Washington, Hoyt became head of the newly created United States Women's Bureau. Being the decisive executive, she soon dissolved as not being effective within the organization. While on assignments in France during the war, Hoyt developed close friendships with Robert Woods Bliss and Mildred Barnes Bliss, eventual creators of Dumbarton Oaks in Washington, D.C. and site of Farrand's best known and still complete work. Hoyt became an executive on the staff of the wartime General Manager of the Red Cross, Harvey D. Gibson.

Following the death of Henry Adams on 27 March 1918, and then of her cousin, Martha Lindsay on 28 April 1918, Hoyt arranged for another assignment in France in order to visit her aunt living in England. Martha Cameron Lindsay was the only child of J. Donald Cameron and his wife Elizabeth Sherman Cameron, and had married Ronald Lindsay in 1909. At the Paris Red Cross Headquarters she was made a member of the Commission and Deputy Commissioner for France.

After returning to America in the summer of 1919, Hoyt decided to give up her landscape gardening business. After working as an executive in a New York bank, followed by real estate ventures, there was campaign work in the presidential campaign of Republican Herbert Hoover for president.

=== Marriage ===
Hoyt married Ronald Charles Lindsay, the widower of her cousin, in the chapel of Stepleton House, at Blandford, Elizabeth Cameron's home in Dorset, England. There were no children from either of Sir Ronald's marriages.

Sir Ronald had previously served twice in Washington: from 1905 to 1907 as Second Secretary under Sir Henry M. Durand, from 1920 to 1921 as Counselor of the Embassy under Viscount Grey of Fallodon and Sir Auckland Geddes. He was the fifth son of James Lindsay, 26th Earl of Crawford.

=== Washington Embassy ===
The Lindsays moved to Washington in March 1930 but did not move into the still incomplete new British Embassy complex, Ambassador's Residence and Chancellor, until June where she had a coronary thrombosis and was away seeking treatment and for the next year. Lindsay then undertook the planting of the Embassy's garden. Long-term friends of Lindsays in Washington included the Blisses, Franklin Roosevelt and Eleanor Roosevelt, Alice Roosevelt Longworth, and Congresswoman Isabella Selmes Greenway.

As ambassador, Ronald Lindsay had an unusually long tenure of nine years in the United States. About to retire in December 1938 when he was asked to stay in his position through the visit of the King and Queen to the country 7–12 June 1939. The Royal garden party that was held in the Embassy's garden was widely viewed as the most desirable social event in the city's history.

=== Later life ===
Sir Ronald Lindsay sailed for England 30 August 1939 and landed in England on 3 September. In New York for family business, Elizabeth Lindsay had planned to follow him but because of the declaration of war (World War II) and travel restrictions, furthered by her own poor health, she was not able to travel. She built a house for herself, called "Lime House" on 46 acres of the old family estate, "Eastover" having been torn down in 1930. From there Lindsay worked for various charities on behalf of the war effort.

Lindsay's gardening life was recognized by having two plants named in her honor. In 1938 American Rose Society had accepted a variety in her name: Rose Hon. Lady Lindsay. Lilac ‘Lady Lindsay,’ bred and introduced in 1943 by T. A. Havemeyer. Lady Lindsay's ashes were interred next to or near the grave of her mother in Lake View Cemetery in Cleveland, Ohio. Her father is also in Lake View, buried with his second wife. The 17th-century Stepleton House is still privately owned. Sir Ronald, his first wife, Martha, and her mother Elizabeth Cameron are all under one gravestone, behind the estate's pre-Norman chapel, St. Mary's. Lady Lindsay's "Lime House" on Centre Island is also still standing.
