= Ronald Lindsay =

British civil servant and diplomat (1877–1945)

The Right Honourable Sir Ronald Lindsay GCB KCMG CVO
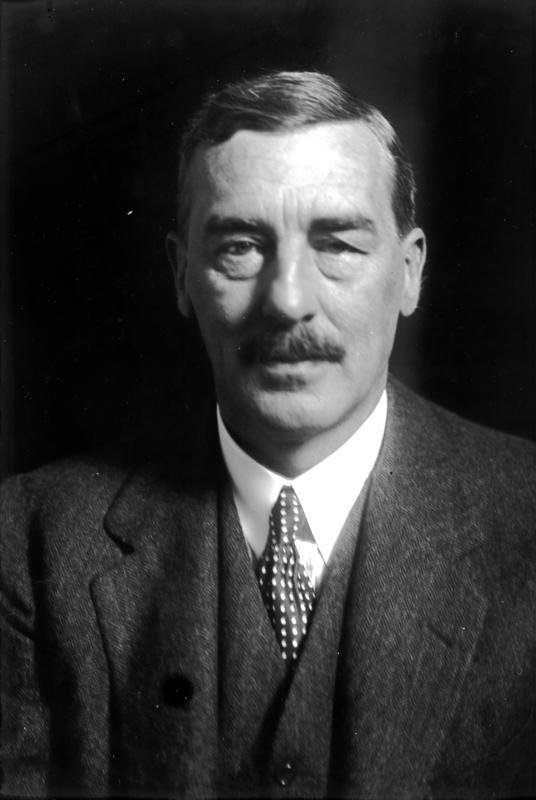
- Sir Ronald Lindsay in 1928.

Permanent Under-Secretary for Foreign Affairs
- In office 1928–1930
- Preceded by: Sir William Tyrrell
- Succeeded by: Sir Robert Vansittart

British Ambassador to the United States
- In office 1930 – June 1939
- Monarchs: George V Edward VIII; George VI
- Prime Minister: Ramsay MacDonald; Stanley Baldwin; Neville Chamberlain
- Preceded by: Sir Esme Howard
- Succeeded by: The Marquess of Lothian

Personal details
- Born: 3 May 1877
- Died: 21 August 1945 (aged 68) Bournemouth, England
- Spouses: Martha Cameron (m. 1909; died 1918) Elizabeth Sherman Hoyt (m. 1924)
- Parent(s): James Lindsay, 26th Earl of Crawford; Emily Florence Bootle-Wilbraham
- Education: Winchester College

Sir Ronald Charles Lindsay GCB GCMG CVO PC (3 May 1877 – 21 August 1945) was a British diplomat. He was Ambassador to Turkey from 1925 to 1926 and to Germany from 1926 to 1928, Permanent Under-Secretary for Foreign Affairs from 1928 to 1930 and Ambassador to the United States from 1930 to 1939.

== Background and education ==
Lindsay was the fifth son of James Lindsay, 26th Earl of Crawford, by Emily Florence Bootle-Wilbraham. David Lindsay, 27th Earl of Crawford, was his elder brother and his maternal grandfather was Colonel the Honourable Edward Bootle-Wilbraham (second son of Edward Bootle-Wilbraham, 1st Baron Skelmersdale).

He was educated at Winchester College in Winchester, Hampshire.

== Career ==
Lindsay was appointed Third Secretary in the Diplomatic Service in January 1901, and advanced to First Secretary in 1911. From 1913 to 1919 he was Under-Secretary of Finance for Egypt, and was made a Grand Officer of the Order of the Nile by the Sultan of Egypt in 1915. From 1919 to 1920 he was Counsellor of the Embassy in Washington D.C., before being posted as Minister Plenipotentiary to France in September 1920. In 1921, he was appointed the Assistant Under-Secretary of State for the Foreign Office, a post he held until 1924. In 1925, he was appointed the Ambassador to Turkey and was sworn of the Privy Council later that year. In 1926, he moved to become Ambassador to Germany. He returned to London in 1928 to become the Permanent Under-Secretary of State for Foreign Affairs, the civil service head of the Foreign Office.

=== British Ambassador to the United States ===
After two years as Permanent Secretary, Lindsay was named as the Ambassador to the United States in November 1929, and took up the position early the next year. He was the first ambassador to move into the brand-new British embassy in 1930, and remained in Washington for almost a decade, retiring in June 1939 to be replaced by Lord Lothian.

Lindsay served an extraordinarily long term of nine years as U.S. ambassador, also as the Dean of the Diplomatic Corps from July 1934 to August 1939, his tenure being extended because of his effectiveness as a diplomat and the growing importance of American assistance during the years leading up to World War II.

His last major official act as ambassador was to host the 1939 Royal Garden Party for King George VI and Queen Elizabeth during the first-ever visit to the United States by a reigning British monarch. The Royal Garden Party at the British embassy was considered the social event of the year in Washington.

=== Honours ===
Lindsay was appointed a Member of the Royal Victorian Order (MVO) in 1908, a Companion of the Order of the Bath in 1922, a Knight Commander of the Order of St Michael and St George in the 1925 New Year Honours, and a Knight Grand Cross of the Order of St Michael and St George in the 1926 Birthday Honours. He was also promoted to Knight Commander of the Order of the Bath (KCB) in the 1929 Birthday Honours. and further promoted to Knight Grand Cross of the Order (GCB) in the 1939 Birthday Honours.

== Personal life ==
Lindsay was married twice, both times to Americans; in 1909 to Martha Cameron, daughter of J. Donald Cameron (a U.S. Senator from Pennsylvania and the 32nd Secretary of War) and his wife Elizabeth Sherman Cameron; and after his first wife's death in April 1918, he married prominent landscape gardener Elizabeth Sherman Hoyt, daughter of Colgate Hoyt, in 1924. Both wives were grandnieces of William Tecumseh Sherman. There were no children from either marriage.

Lindsay died in Bournemouth in August 1945, aged 68. Lady Lindsay died in September 1954, aged 68.

== Sources ==
- Spinzia, Raymond E. and Judith A. Long Island's Prominent North Shore Families: Their Estates and Their Country Homes. vol. I. College Station, TX, 2006

Diplomatic posts
| Preceded by Sir Horace Rumbold, Bt | British Ambassador to Turkey; 1925–26 | Succeeded by Sir George Clerk |
| Preceded by The Lord D'Abernon | British Ambassador to Germany; 1926–28 | Succeeded by Sir Horace Rumbold, Bt |
| Preceded by Sir Esme Howard | British Ambassador to the United States; 1930–39 | Succeeded by The Marquess of Lothian |
Government offices
| Preceded by Sir William Tyrrell | Permanent Under-Secretary for Foreign Affairs; 1928–30 | Succeeded by Sir Robert Vansittart |
