= Robe Canyon Historic Trail =

Hiking trail in Washington, United States

Coordinates: 48.1099°N 121.8563°W

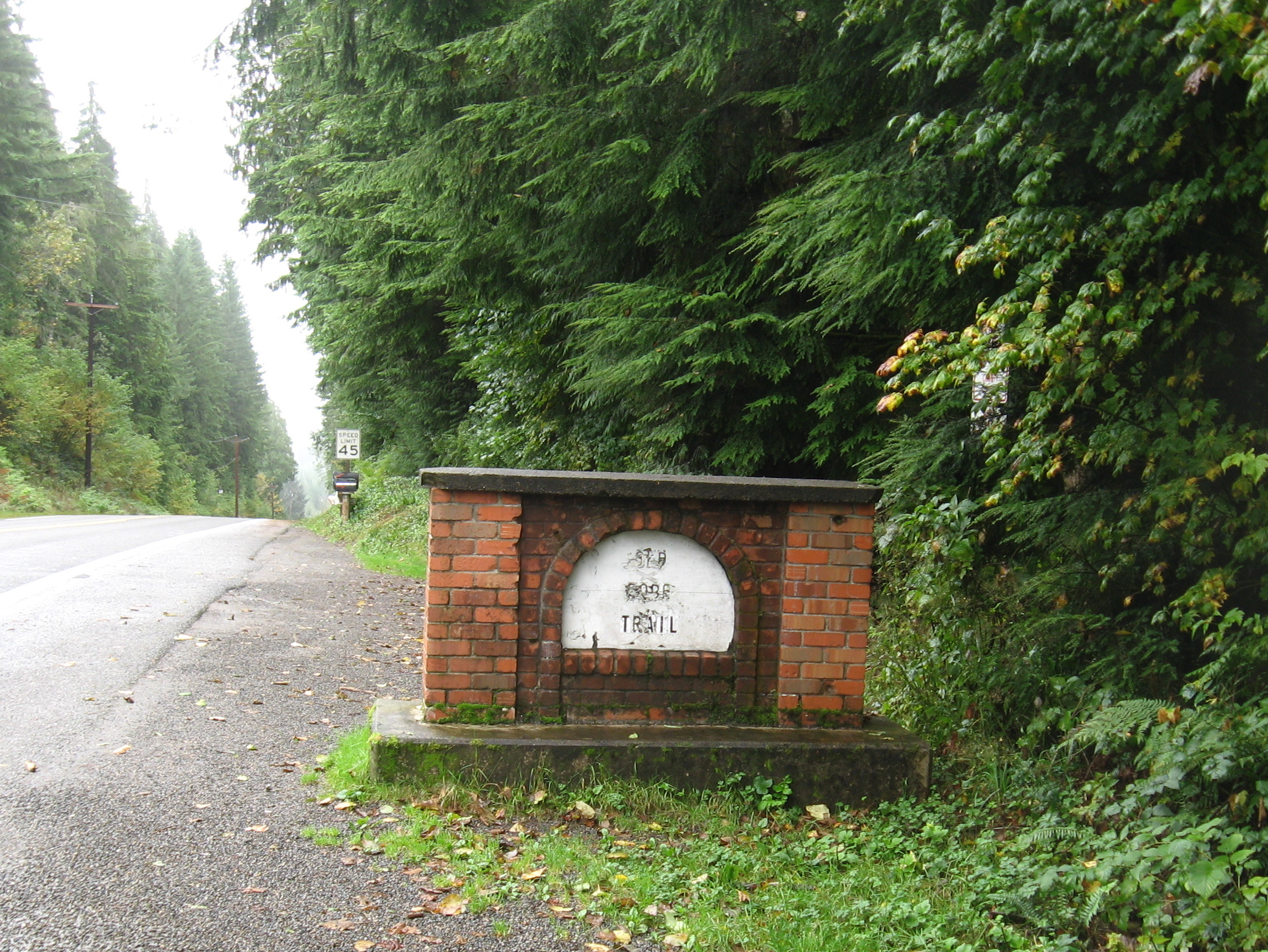
Old Robe Trail sign

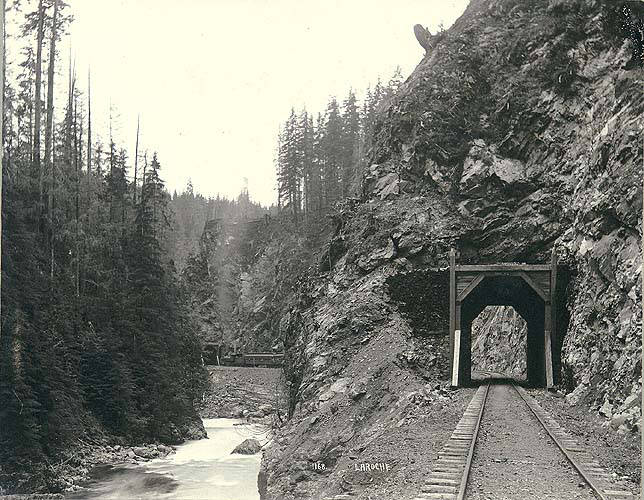
An 1894 view of a train beyond tunnel 5 in the Stillaguamish Canyon.

The Robe Canyon Historic Trail is a county park and hiking trail located east of Granite Falls, Washington. The park, maintained by Snohomish County, encompasses 970 acres (3.9 km^{2}) of wilderness area along the Stillaguamish River and features railroad tunnels, river beaches, and hiking trails.

== History ==
Robe Canyon was chosen as a part of the railway to transport gold and silver ore mined at Monte Cristo located in the Cascade Mountains to Everett. In 1892, the Everett and Monte Cristo Railway was built. Although the canyon section of the railway had six tunnels, since much of the route was constructed on wooden frameworks at the edge of the bubbling stream, the structures were often swept away in floods, requiring constant repair. During the 19th century, the railway enjoyed good reputations for a scenic trip to the mountains.

Starting in 1995, 970 acres (3.9 km^{2}), including a portion of the historical railway segment, has been acquired by Snohomish County from John Hancock Corporation and Trillium Corporation.

Since 1995 when Snohomish County acquired the first phase of Robe Canyon, volunteers have maintained the Old Robe Trail. In 2002, volunteers continued the tradition, led by Volunteers for Outdoor Washington, performing annual maintenance, installing log-railings, and relocating a section of trail lost to the river's winter rampages. Yet, the major volunteer effort was reserved for construction of the new Lime Kiln Trail at the west end of the park. Continuing the work started in 1998, over 90 volunteers invested 262 volunteer work days last year. Finally, in the late fall, trail workers reached a significant milestone: the site of the historic railway bridge spanning the South Fork of the Stillaguamish River across from Tunnel #1.

== Access ==
The trail is located on Forest Service Road 41 near the Mountain Loop Highway, approximately 6 miles (9.7 km) east of Granite Falls.
