= Big Four Ski Area =

Ski area in Washington, US

- Interactive map of Big Four Ski Area
- Location: Big Four Mountain
- Nearest city: Granite Falls, Washington
- Coordinates: 48.0674°N 121.514°W
- Base elevation: 1,700 ft (520 m)
- Skiable area: ?
- Trails: ?
- Lift system: Surface
- Terrain parks: none
- Snowmaking: No
- Night skiing: No

Big Four Ski Area was an alpine ski area that operated in Washington state on the north side of Big Four Mountain, approximately 26 miles east of Granite Falls, Washington. It was opened during the early 19th century, and was part of the Big Four Mountain Inn, first serviced by railroad. Located in the Stillaguamish River Valley below the ice cave basin, it closed before 1949, when the inn was destroyed in a fire. Little else is known about the ski area.
