= Lord Hill Regional Park =

Country park in Washington, United States

Coordinates: 47°50′53″N 122°02′59″W

Lord Hill Regional Park is a regional country park located in Snohomish County, Washington. The park features miles of wilderness trails for equestrians and mountain bikers, as well as hikers. The park grounds cover 1,300 acres (5.3 km^{2}) of wilderness forest. Small ponds and wetlands are located within the park site. A large population of animals, birds, and fish inhabit the park.

The park sits on a ridge that runs parallel to the Snohomish River. The ridge, which reaches nearly 800 feet (240 m) at Bald Hill, consists of vertical basalt outcroppings that rise from the river floor. Settlers arrived when Mitchell Lord purchased 80 acres (320,000 m^{2}) on the hill in 1878 and started dairying on his 130-acre farm in 1884. His home still remains on the park grounds. By the mid-1930s, the area attracted the logging industry, and all the old-growth was cut down. In the 1980s, some second-growth timber was harvested by the Department of Natural Resources. At present, the park is under the management of Snohomish County Parks and Recreation Department but maintained by a group of volunteers, for the department lacks the resources to staff the park full-time.
