= Snohomish River =

River in northwest Washington, United States

- Snohomish River in Everett, Washington

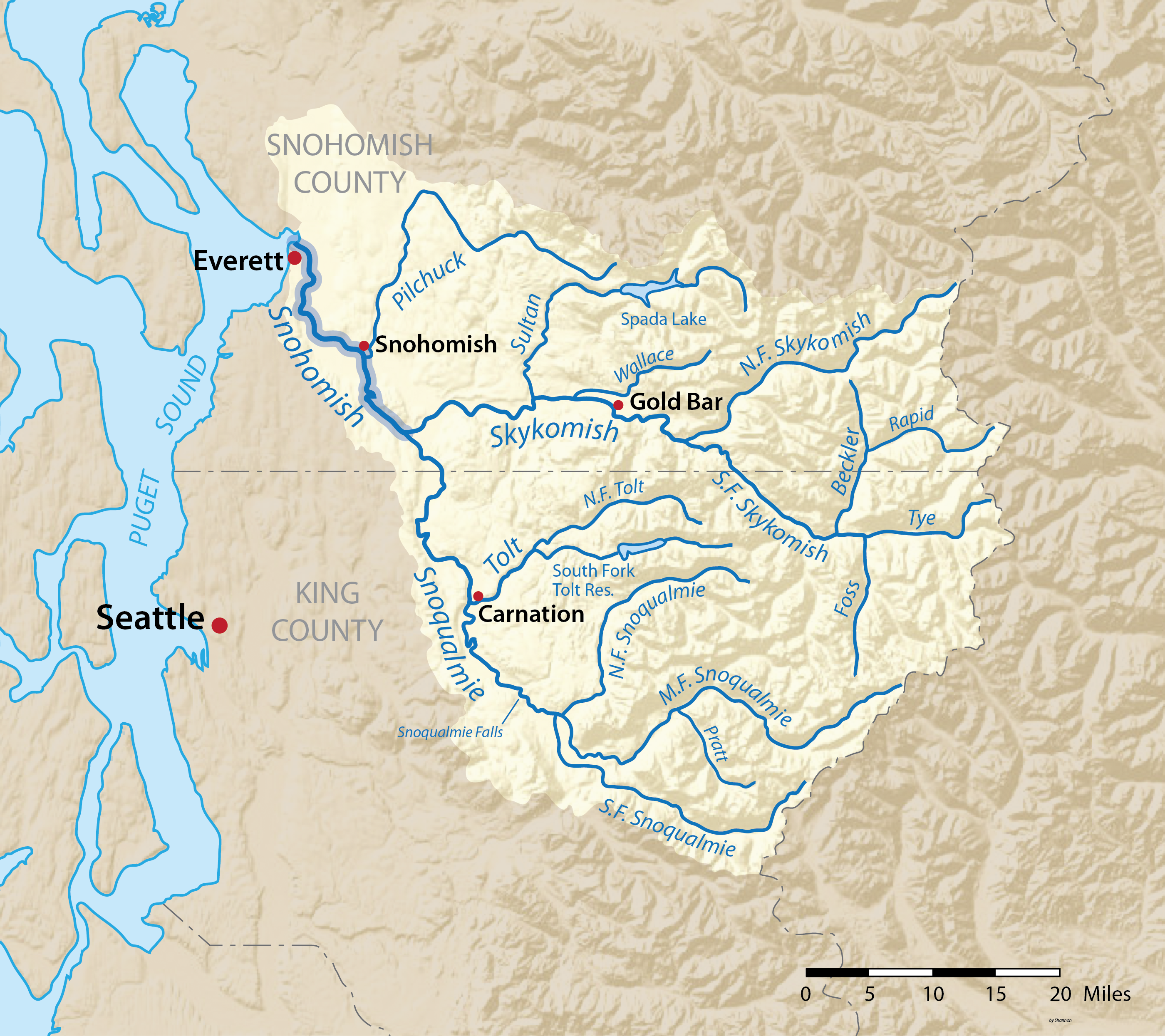
- Map of the Snohomish River and tributaries

- Mouth of the Snohomish River in Washington Snohomish River (the United States)

Location
- Country: United States
- State: Washington
- County: Snohomish

Physical characteristics
- Source: Confluence of the Skykomish River and the Snoqualmie River
  - location: Monroe
  - coordinates: 47°49′48″N 122°2′47″W
- Mouth: Puget Sound
  - location: Port Gardner
  - coordinates: 48°1′16″N 122°12′30″W
  - elevation: 0 m (0 ft)
- Length: 20 mi (32 km)
- Basin size: 1,856 mi^{2} (4,810 km^{2})
- Discharge
  - location: Near Monroe
  - average: 9,511 cu ft/s (269.3 m^{3}/s)
  - minimum: 763 cu ft/s (21.6 m^{3}/s)
  - maximum: 150,000 cu ft/s (4,200 m^{3}/s)

The Snohomish River is a river in Snohomish County, Washington, formed by the confluence of the Skykomish and Snoqualmie rivers near Monroe. It flows northwest entering Port Gardner Bay, part of Puget Sound, between Everett and Marysville. The Pilchuck River is its main tributary and joins the river at Snohomish. The river system drains the west side of the Cascade Mountains from Snoqualmie Pass to north of Stevens Pass.

Measured at Monroe, the Snohomish River has an average annual flow of 9,500 cubic feet per second (270 m^{3}/s). In comparison, the Columbia River, Washington's largest river, has an average flow of about 265,000 cubic feet per second (7,500 m^{3}/s).

== Course ==
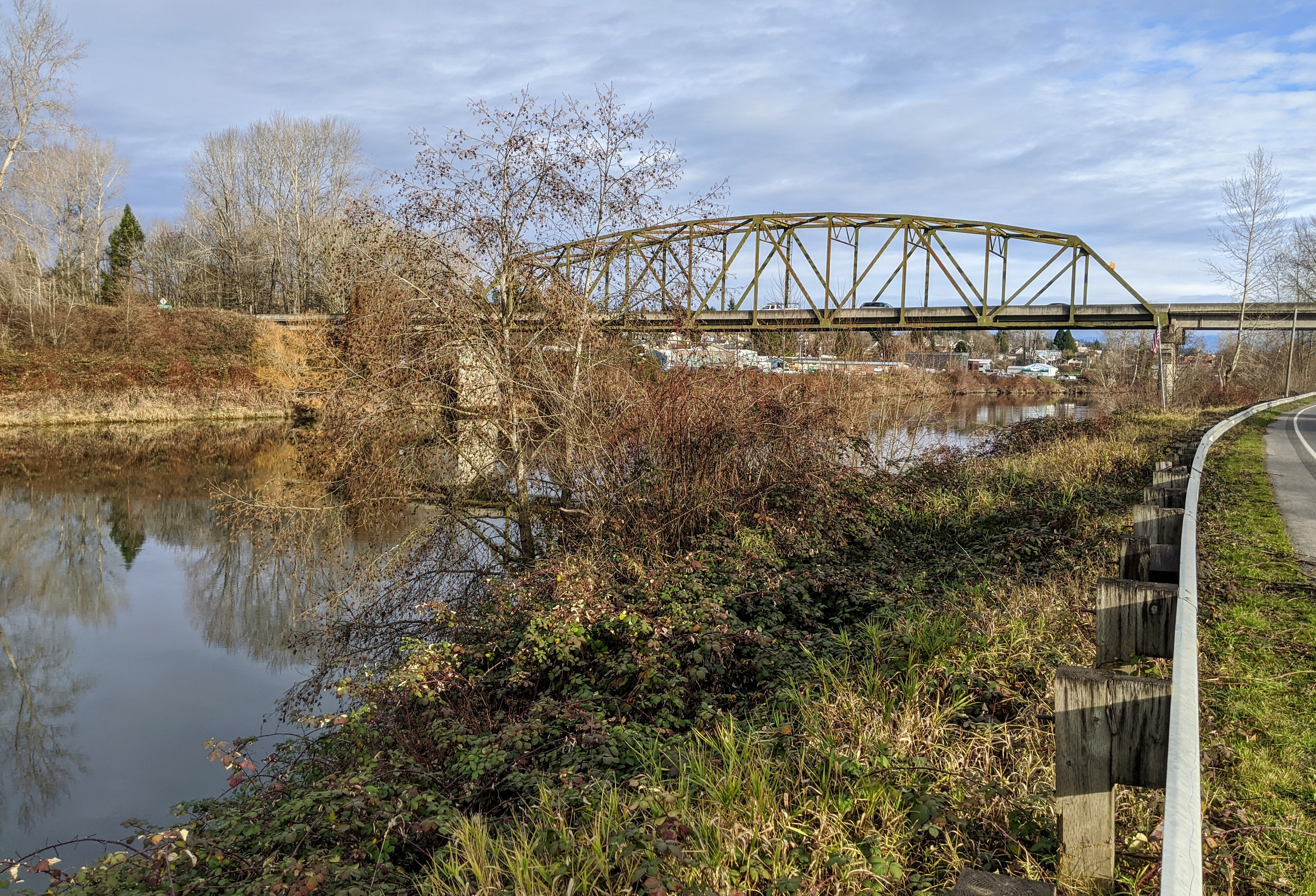
State Route 9 bridge in front of Downtown Snohomish

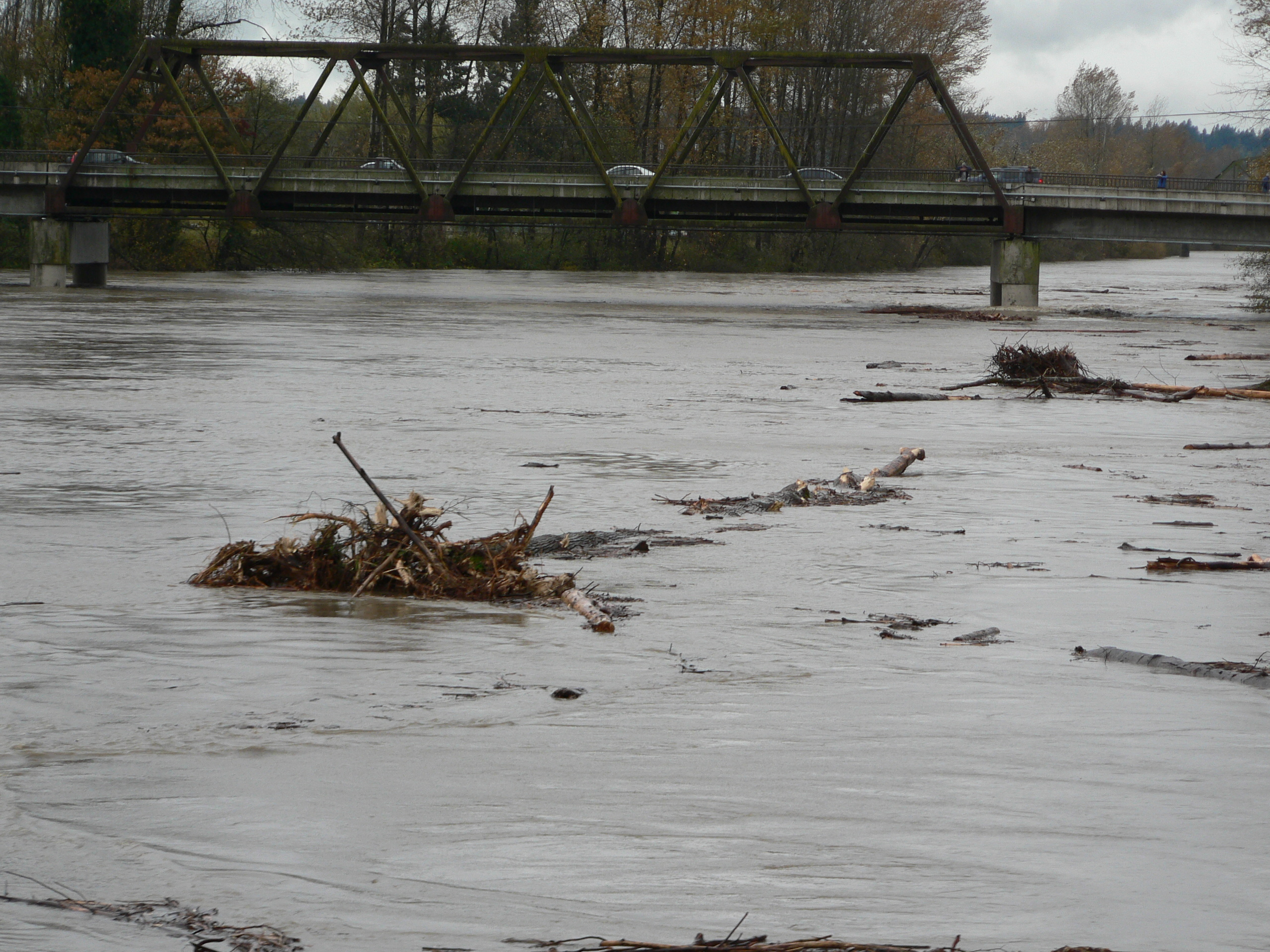
Debris swept under Airport Way Bridge in Snohomish in November 2006

The Snohomish River forms at the confluence of the Snoqualmie and Skykomish Rivers just west of Monroe. Both of these rivers originate in the Cascades and drain the west slopes of the mountains in southeastern Snohomish County and northeastern King County. The Snohomish River flows generally northwestward from the confluence, passing under state route 522 and flowing alongside Lord Hill Regional Park before reaching downtown Snohomish. Here, it is joined by the Pilchuck River, its main tributary, and flows under state route 9. From Snohomish, the river continues northwestward through a broad floodplain, forming the eastern boundary of the city of Everett. The final few miles of the river in Everett form the Snohomish River estuary, a river delta that features wetlands and tideflats spread out across various islands and arms of the river. Several bridges carry U.S. Route 2, Interstate 5, and State Route 529 across the delta. The river then empties into Possession Sound, which is part of Puget Sound, between Everett and Marysville.

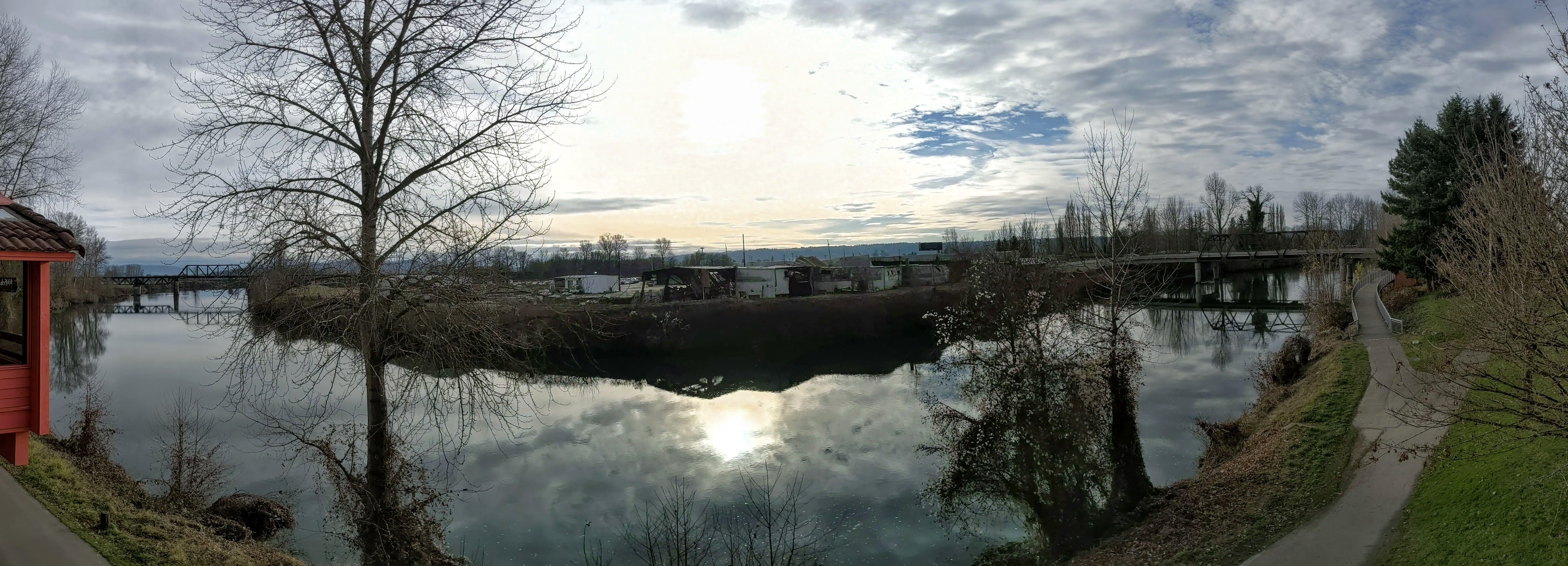
Panoramic view of the Snohomish River from downtown Snohomish

== Human history ==
In November 2024, a ballot measure in the City of Everett proposed personhood and rights for the Snohomish River itself within the city limits. It was approved by voters and allows residents to file lawsuits on behalf of the river.

=== Pollution ===
The lower Snohomish River was a site of major industry during the 20th century that contaminated the area with various pollutants, including oil and fuel products from former mills and factories. An ore smelter operated by ASARCO contaminated soil and groundwater near the Snohomish River with arsenic. The river has also been used as a site for illegal dumping of tires, litter, and batteries. The county government began a program to remove derelict vessels, including old boats, in the Snohomish River delta in 2018; by 2023, the program had removed 27 vessels that had leaked pollutants into the river.

== See also ==
- List of rivers of Washington (state)
