= Colgate Hoyt =

American businessman (1849-1922)

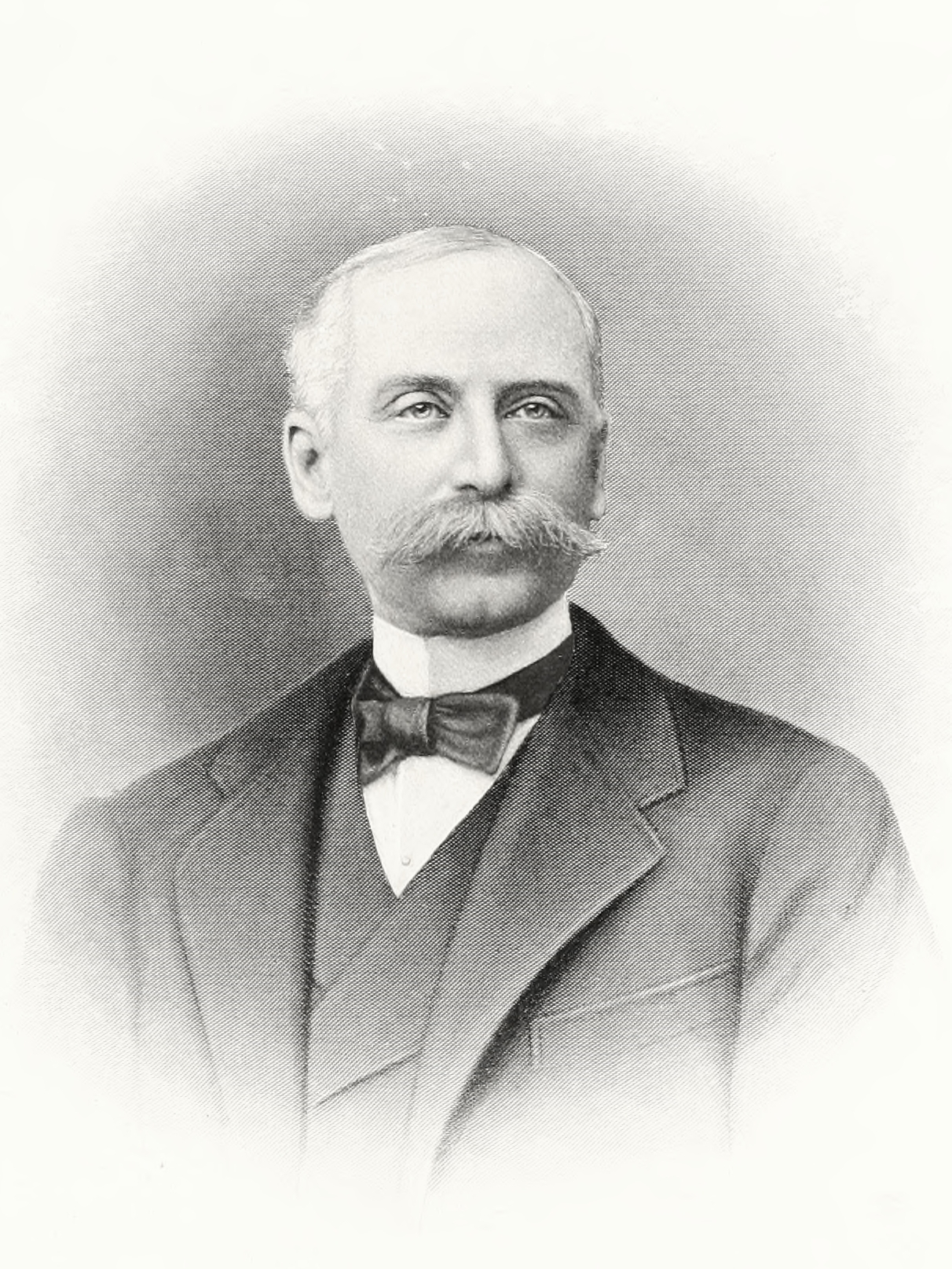
- Colgate Hoyt, 1904
- Born: 2 March 1849; Cleveland, Ohio, U.S.
- Died: 30 January 1922 (aged 72); Oyster Bay, New York, U.S.
- Occupations: Banker, businessman
- Spouse: Lida W. Sherman (m. 1873; died 1908)
- Children: 4
- Parents: James Madison Hoyt (father); Mary Ella Beebee (mother)

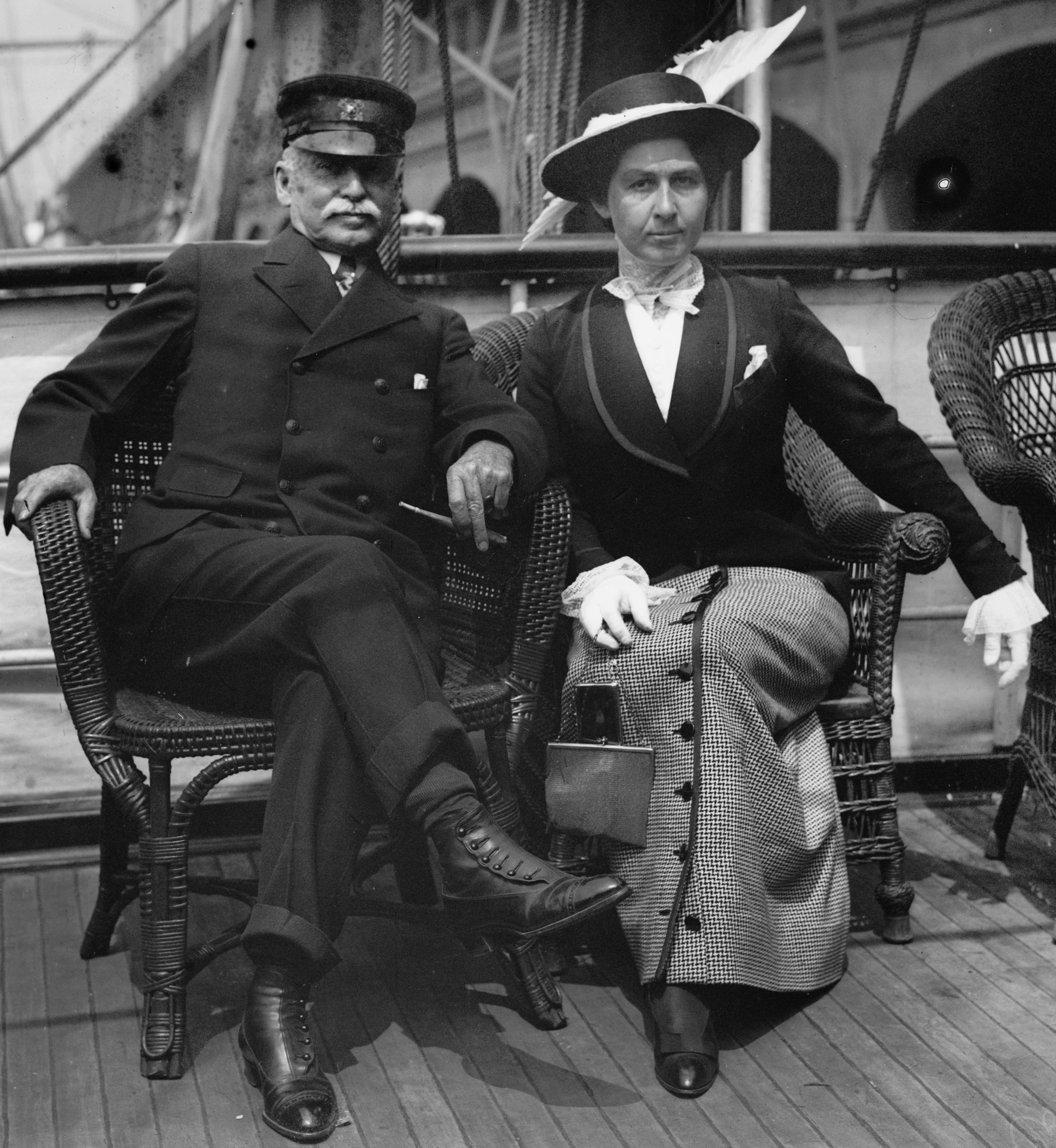
Colgate and Lida Hoyt

Colgate Hoyt (March 2, 1849 – January 30, 1922) was an American businessman active in the late nineteenth century.

== Early life ==
Hoyt was born on March 2, 1849, in Cleveland, Ohio. He was one of six children born to Mary Ella (née Beebe) Hoyt (1814–1890) and Dr. James Madison Hoyt (1815–1895), a Baptist minister, lawyer, businessman and author. Among his siblings was Wayland Hoyt, who was also a Baptist minister and author. He was a descendant of Simon Hoyt, who landed in Massachusetts in 1628 and settled in Windsor, Connecticut, and Walker Hoyt, who was one of the first settlers of Norwalk.

Hoyt attended public schools in Cleveland before attending the Phillips Academy in Andover, Massachusetts. He abandoned school due to his father's ill health, going into this father's law offices, before entering real estate.

== Career ==
In 1881 he came to New York and became affiliated with James B. Colgate & Co. (James Boorman Colgate was his uncle by marriage) For many years thereafter, he was a prominent financier in New York on Wall Street who specialized in railroad transportation. He later became a partner of Colgate, Hoyt & Co. in which he was active in the organization and finance of many businesses.

He was a director of the Oregon Railway and Navigation Company, and one of the founders of Everett, Washington, where a main street is named after him.

Hoyt and Charles Colby advised John D. Rockefeller, who they knew from the Fifth Avenue Baptist Church. Much of the capital used to build Everett, Washington came from Rockefeller's investments, apparently without his knowledge. Rockefeller naively trusted Hoyt and Colby largely due to their Baptist affiliation. According to Pulitzer prize-winning historian Ron Chernow, drawing on Frederick T. Gates memoir and other sources, the duo fleeced Rockefeller, which Rockefeller initially refused to believe. They left him with significant losses in speculative land, timber, and other industrial investments after exiting the investments themselves. The situation was uncovered by Gates who was asked to assess investment sites on his due diligence travels for Rockefeller's philanthropic efforts. Gates personally visited supposed investment sites in Alabama, Wisconsin, and Colorado. One of the visits was to an iron ore mine which Rockefeller believed was generating $1,000 per day in profit. In reality, he was losing that amount daily while Hoyt and Colby were ostensibly using their connections to inflate speculative activity in local real estate. Rockefeller, Gates, and possibly George Rogers (of Standard Oil) found that Hoyt and Colby had been sending statements with falsified or misleading financial values. Gates ultimately discovered around 20 "sick or dying corporations" in the scheme. It is unclear whether Hoyt or Colby engaged in illegal activity and there is no evidence they originally planned to defraud Rockefeller, though their actions would likely be considered fraudulent by modern standards. It is also possible that one of the two men played a lesser role in the scheme. Rockefeller, known to be easy on family and friends, did not pursue legal remedies and Hoyt appears to have recovered professionally.

== Personal life ==
In 1873, he was married to Lida Williams Sherman (1853–1908), the daughter of Charles Taylor Sherman and niece of William Tecumseh Sherman. Together, they were the parents of four children:

- Anne Sherman Hoyt (1875–1951), who served with the American Red Cross in France during World War I.
- Charles Sherman Hoyt (1879–1953)
- Colgate Hoyt Jr. (1883–1963), a banker who served as administrative office of New York headquarters of the Selective Service.
- Elizabeth Sherman Hoyt (1885–1954), who married the British diplomat Sir Ronald Lindsay, the fifth son of James Lindsay, 26th Earl of Crawford, in 1924.

After the death of his first wife in 1908, he was married to the former Katherine Sharp (1879–1972) at Wood Manse in Greenwich, Connecticut, in 1912. Katharine, who was previously married to George Scott Cheeseman, was a daughter of Judge Solomon A. Sharp, a California Assemblyman and Senator. In New York City, his residence was at 121 Madison Avenue and Hoyt's country estate was a 46-acre parcel known as Eastover that was located on New York's Centre Island.

Hoyt died on January 30, 1922, at his home in Oyster Bay, New York. After his death, his widow remarried to geologist Charles Page Perin in 1925.
