= Port Gardner =

Inlet of Possession Sound, Washington, United States

Coordinates: 48°0′27″N 122°13′19″W

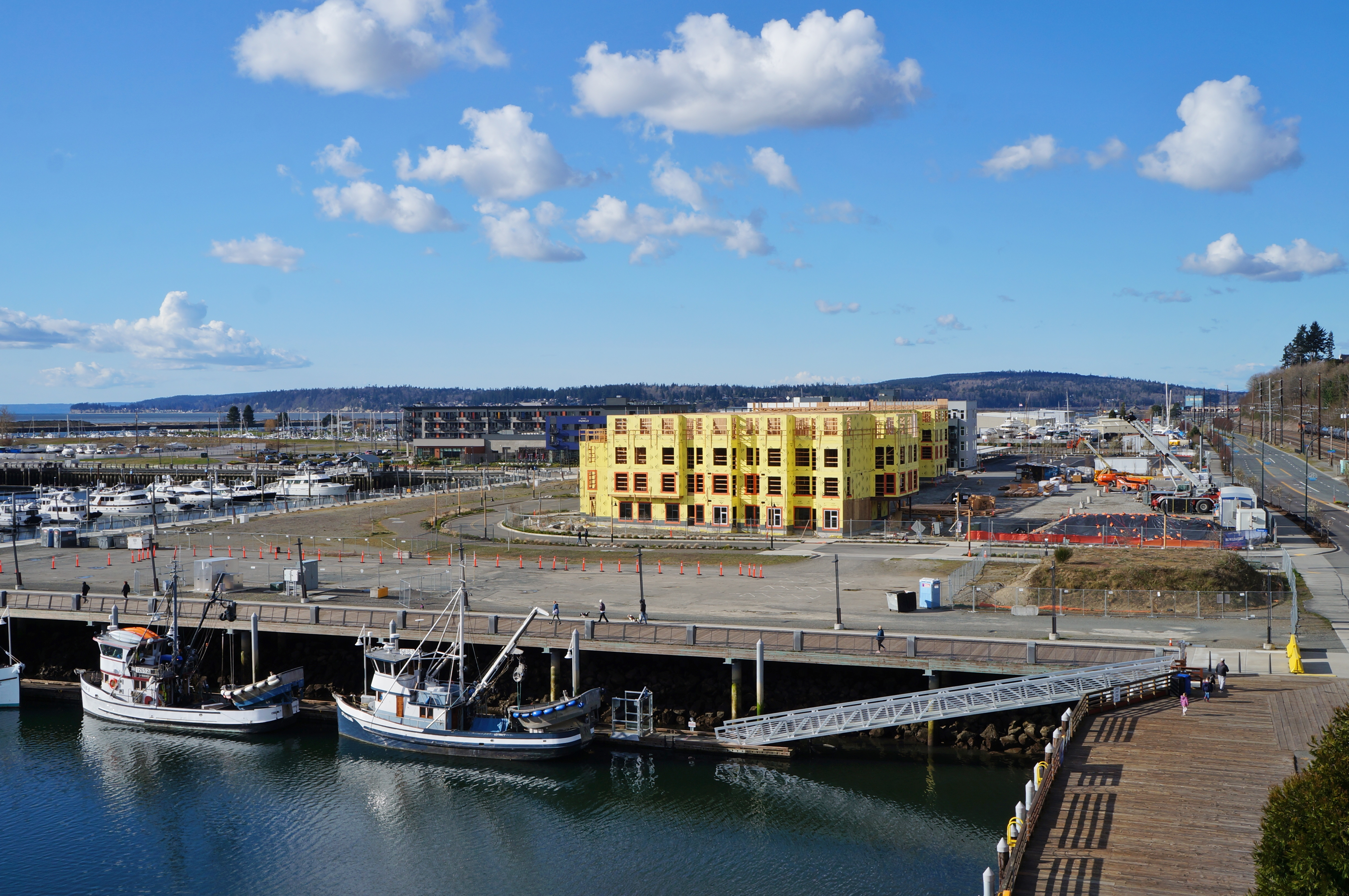
Port Gardner Wharf

Port Gardner, also known as Port Gardner Bay, is an inlet of Possession Sound on which the city of Everett, Washington is located. The Snohomish River flows into the north end of the bay.

It was named by George Vancouver for his patron and former commander, Alan Gardner. Vancouver meant the name to apply to all of Saratoga Passage, but over time it came to refer to only the bay near Everett.
