= Mount Forgotten =

Mountain in Washington (state), United States

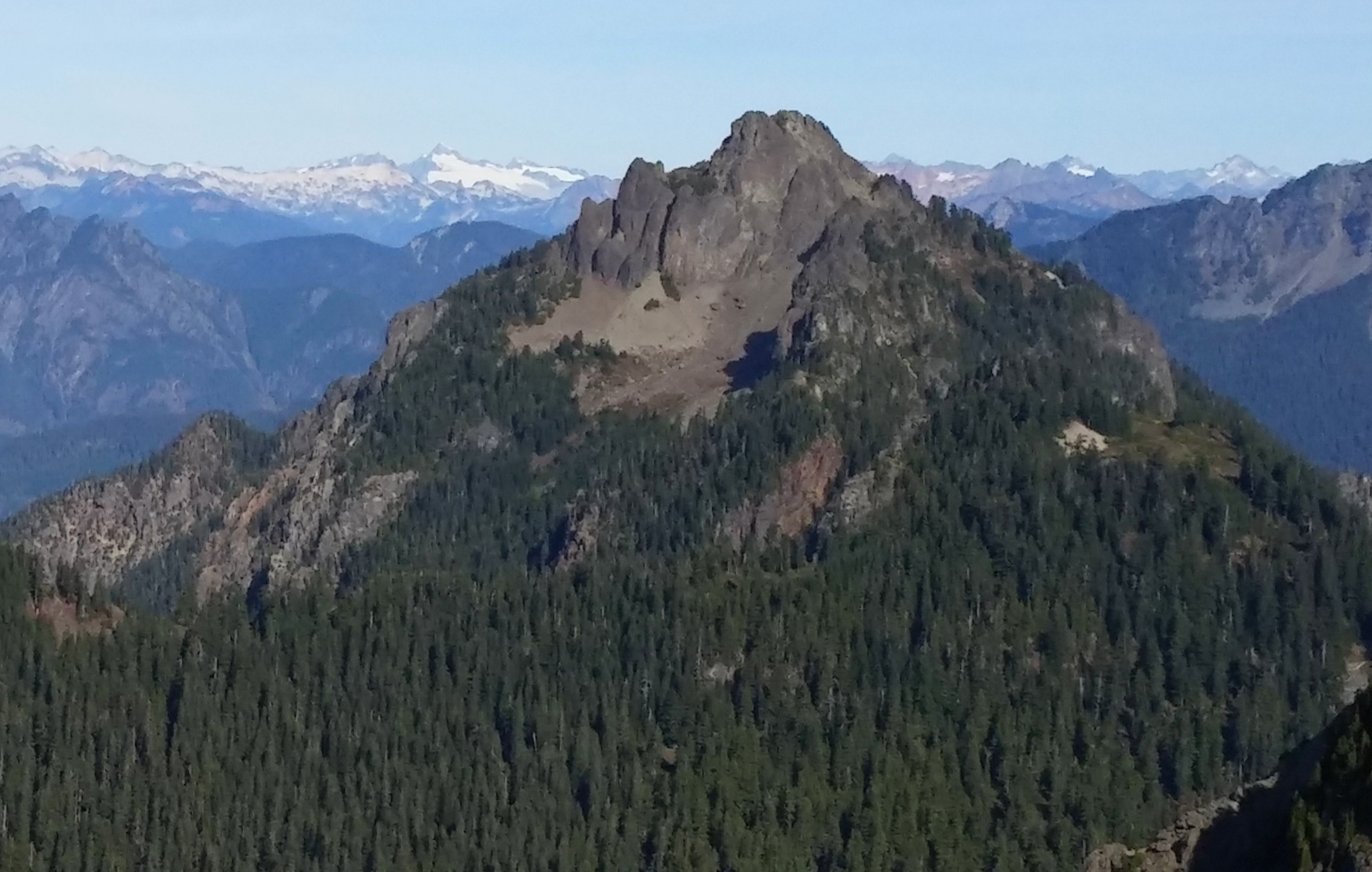
- Mount Forgotten seen from Mt. Dickerman

Highest point
- Elevation: 6,005 ft (1,830 m)
- Prominence: 2,725 ft (831 m)
- Parent peak: Mount Pugh (7,201 ft)
- Isolation: 4.48 mi (7.21 km)
- Coordinates: 48°05′55″N 121°26′43″W

Geography
- Location within Washington (state) Location within the United States
- Interactive map of Mount Forgotten
- Country: United States
- State: Washington
- County: Snohomish
- Parent range: North Cascades; Cascade Range
- Topo map: USGS Bedal

Geology
- Rock type: Volcanic breccia

Climbing
- Easiest route: class 3 scrambling

Mount Forgotten is a 6,005-foot-elevation (1,830-meter) mountain summit near the western edge of the North Cascades, in Snohomish County of Washington state. It is located five miles north of Barlow Pass along the Mountain Loop Highway near the Monte Cristo area and is situated on land administered by the Mount Baker-Snoqualmie National Forest. The nearest higher peak is Mount Pugh, 4.22 mi (6.79 km) to the northeast. Precipitation runoff from the mountain drains into tributaries of the Sauk River.

== Climate ==
Mount Forgotten is located in the marine west coast climate zone of western North America. Most weather fronts originating in the Pacific Ocean travel northeast toward the Cascade Mountains. As fronts approach the North Cascades, they are forced upward by the peaks of the Cascade Range (orographic lift), causing them to drop their moisture in the form of rain or snowfall onto the Cascades. As a result, the west side of the North Cascades experiences high precipitation, especially during the winter months in the form of snowfall. Because of maritime influence, snow tends to be wet and heavy, resulting in high avalanche danger. During winter months, weather is usually cloudy, but due to high pressure systems over the Pacific Ocean that intensify during summer months, there is often little or no cloud cover during the summer. Due to its temperate climate and proximity to the Pacific Ocean, areas west of the Cascade Crest very rarely experience temperatures below 0 °F (−18 °C) or above 80 °F (27 °C). The months July through September offer the most favorable weather for viewing or climbing this peak.

== Geology ==
The North Cascades features some of the most rugged topography in the Cascade Range with craggy peaks, ridges, and deep glacial valleys. Geological events occurring many years ago created the diverse topography and drastic elevation changes over the Cascade Range leading to various climate differences. These climate differences lead to vegetation variety defining the ecoregions in this area.

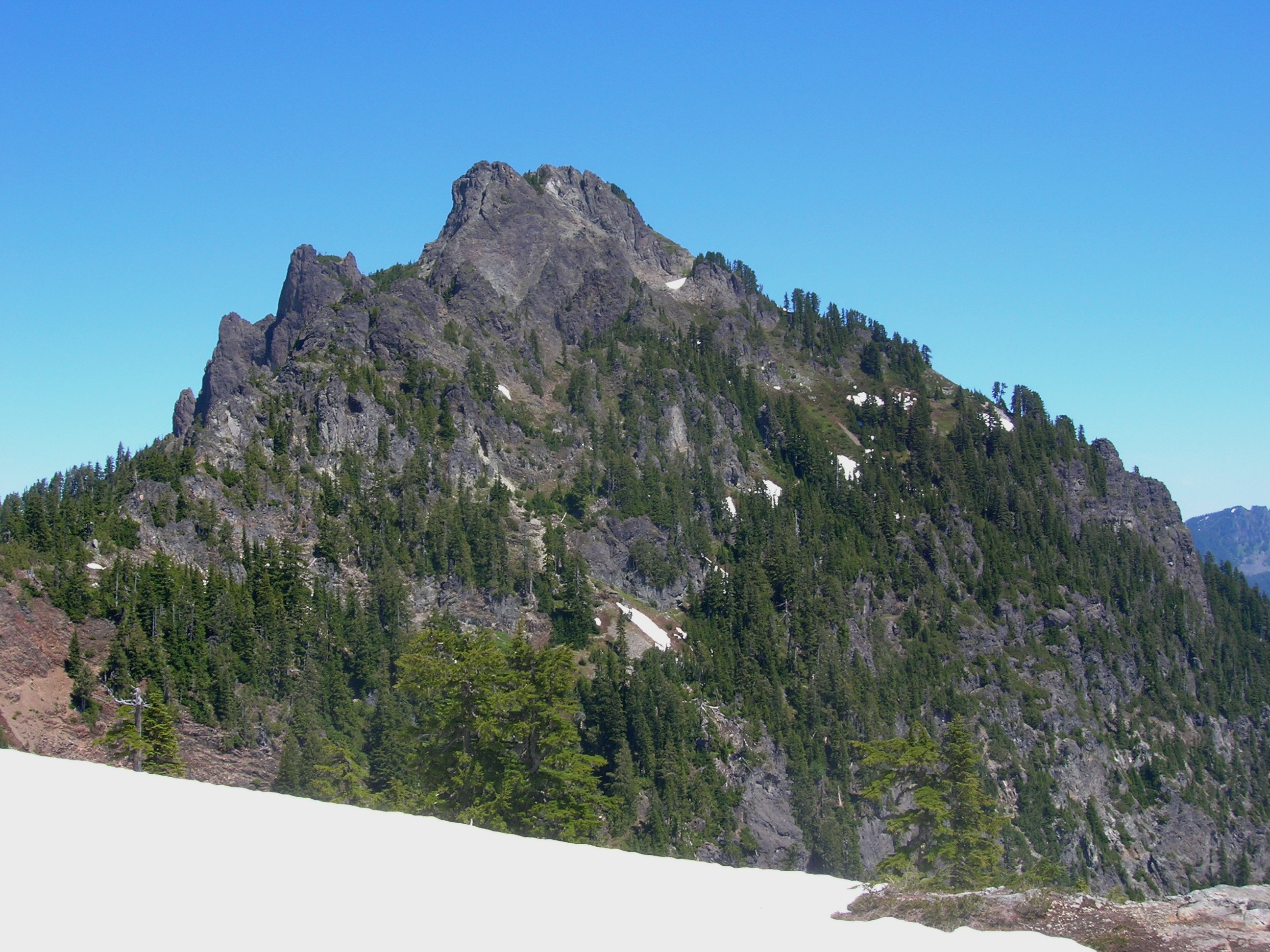
Mount Forgotten

The history of the formation of the Cascade Mountains dates back millions of years ago to the late Eocene Epoch. With the North American Plate overriding the Pacific Plate, episodes of volcanic igneous activity persisted. Glacier Peak, a stratovolcano that is 15.35 mi (24.70 km) east of Mount Forgotten, began forming in the mid-Pleistocene and Forgotten is composed of volcanic breccia. In addition, small fragments of the oceanic and continental lithosphere called terranes created the North Cascades about 50 million years ago.

During the Pleistocene period dating back over two million years ago, glaciation advancing and retreating repeatedly scoured the landscape leaving deposits of rock debris. The U-shaped cross section of the river valleys is a result of recent glaciation. Uplift and faulting in combination with glaciation have been the dominant processes which have created the tall peaks and deep valleys of the North Cascades area.
