= Big Four Mountain =

Mountain in Washington (state), United States

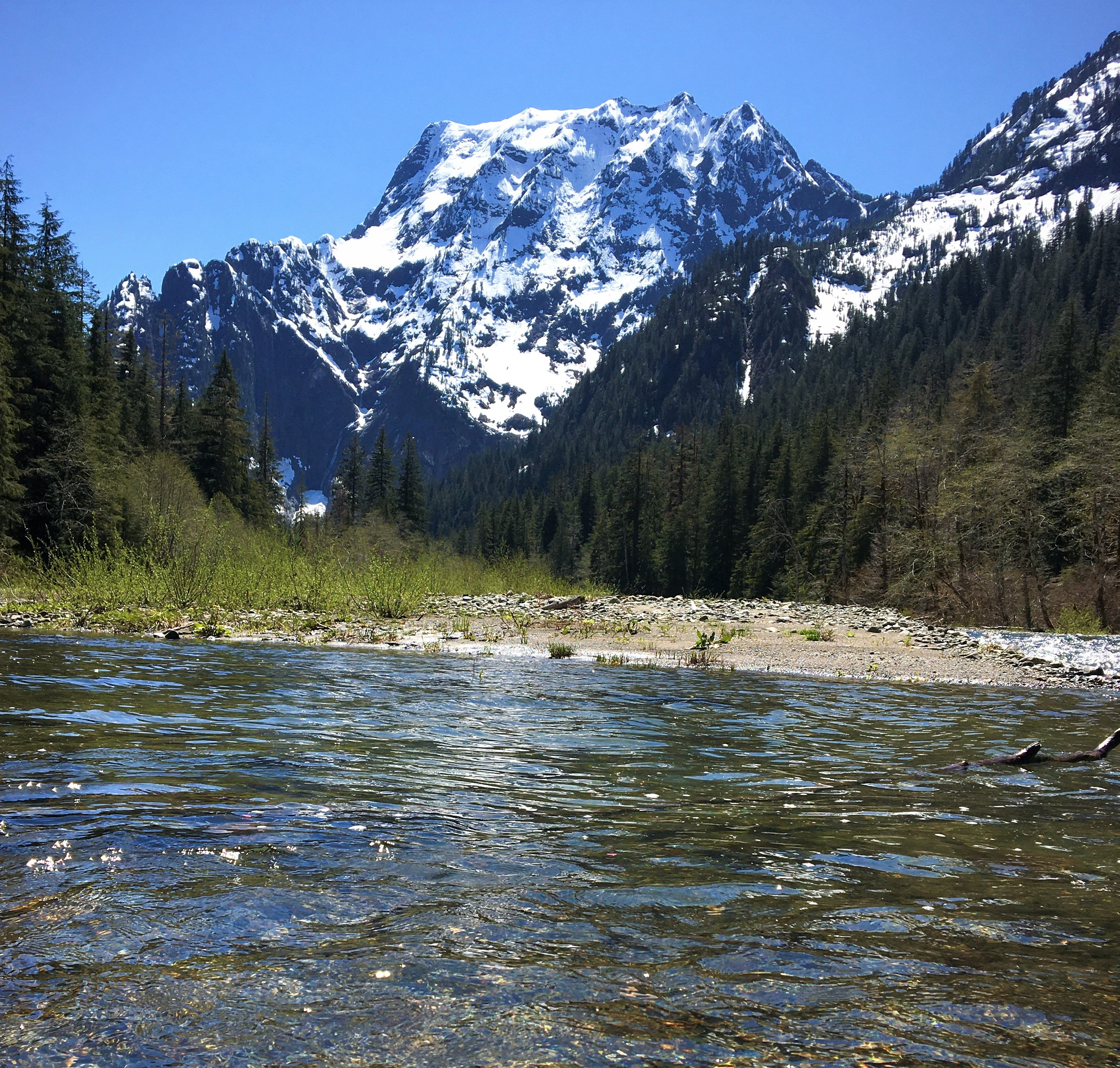
- Big Four Mountain with South Fork Stillaguamish River

Highest point
- Elevation: 6,160+ feet (1,880+ m)
- Prominence: 1,080 ft (330 m)
- Parent peak: Vesper Peak (6,214 ft)
- Isolation: 2.1 mi (3.4 km)
- Coordinates: 48°02′35″N 121°31′26″W

Geography
- Location within Washington (state) Location within the United States
- Location: Snohomish County, Washington, U.S.
- Parent range: Cascade Range
- Topo map: USGS Silverton

Geology
- Rock age: pre-Tertiary
- Rock type: Metasedimentary rock

Climbing
- First ascent: 1931
- Easiest route: class 3 scrambling East Face

Big Four is a 6,160+ feet (1,880+ m) mountain summit in the Cascade Range, located about 20 miles (32 km) east of Granite Falls, Washington. It is situated 4 miles (6.4 km) west of Barlow Pass along the Mountain Loop Highway, near the Monte Cristo area, on land administered by the Mount Baker-Snoqualmie National Forest. Debris piles on the mountain's northern flank form as a result of avalanche activity. These fields of disturbed snow are able to remain year round in the shadow of the mountain. During the summer months snow-melt streams flow beneath the debris piles and cause caves to form in the ice. The Big Four Ice Caves vary in size from season to season and are unpredictably dangerous. The mountain is open to the public and a large snowfield can be reached by a short trail, but the snowfield itself is off-limits due to cave-ins and slides which have killed hikers in incidents in 1998, 2010, and 2015.

== History ==
Big Four is not named for the five peaks on its top. Possible origins for its name include a figure four that is visible in one of its snowfields and a group of four brothers who were known to prospect and trap in the valley. The snow accumulation at the location of the ice caves was known as "Rucker's Glacier" (not actually a glacier), and is considered the lowest elevation permanent ice in the Cascades.

Big Four Inn was a resort near the base of the mountain built by the Rucker Brothers in 1921 until it was destroyed by fire in 1949.

The first ascent of Big Four was made July 19, 1931, by Forest Farr and Art Winder via the northwest ridge.

== Climate ==
Big Four Mountain is located in the marine west coast climate zone of western North America. Most weather fronts originate in the Pacific Ocean, and travel northeast toward the Cascade Mountains. As fronts approach, they are forced upward by the peaks of the Cascade Range, causing them to drop their moisture in the form of rain or snowfall onto the Cascades (Orographic lift). As a result, the west side of the Cascades experiences high precipitation, especially during the winter months in the form of snowfall. During winter months, weather is usually cloudy, but, due to high pressure systems over the Pacific Ocean that intensify during summer months, there is often little or no cloud cover during the summer. Because of maritime influence, snow tends to be wet and heavy, resulting in avalanche danger. The months July through September offer the most favorable weather for viewing or climbing this peak.

== Geology ==
The North Cascades features some of the most rugged topography in the Cascade Range with craggy peaks, ridges, and deep glacial valleys. Geological events occurring many years ago created the diverse topography and drastic elevation changes over the Cascade Range leading to the various climate differences. These climate differences lead to vegetation variety defining the ecoregions in this area.

The history of the formation of the Cascade Mountains dates back millions of years ago to the late Eocene Epoch. With the North American Plate overriding the Pacific Plate, episodes of volcanic igneous activity persisted. In addition, small fragments of the oceanic and continental lithosphere called terranes created the North Cascades about 50 million years ago.

During the Pleistocene period dating back over two million years ago, glaciation advancing and retreating repeatedly scoured the landscape leaving deposits of rock debris. The U-shaped cross section of the river valleys is a result of recent glaciation. Uplift and faulting in combination with glaciation have been the dominant processes which have created the tall peaks and deep valleys of the North Cascades area.

== See also ==
- Siletzia

== Gallery ==
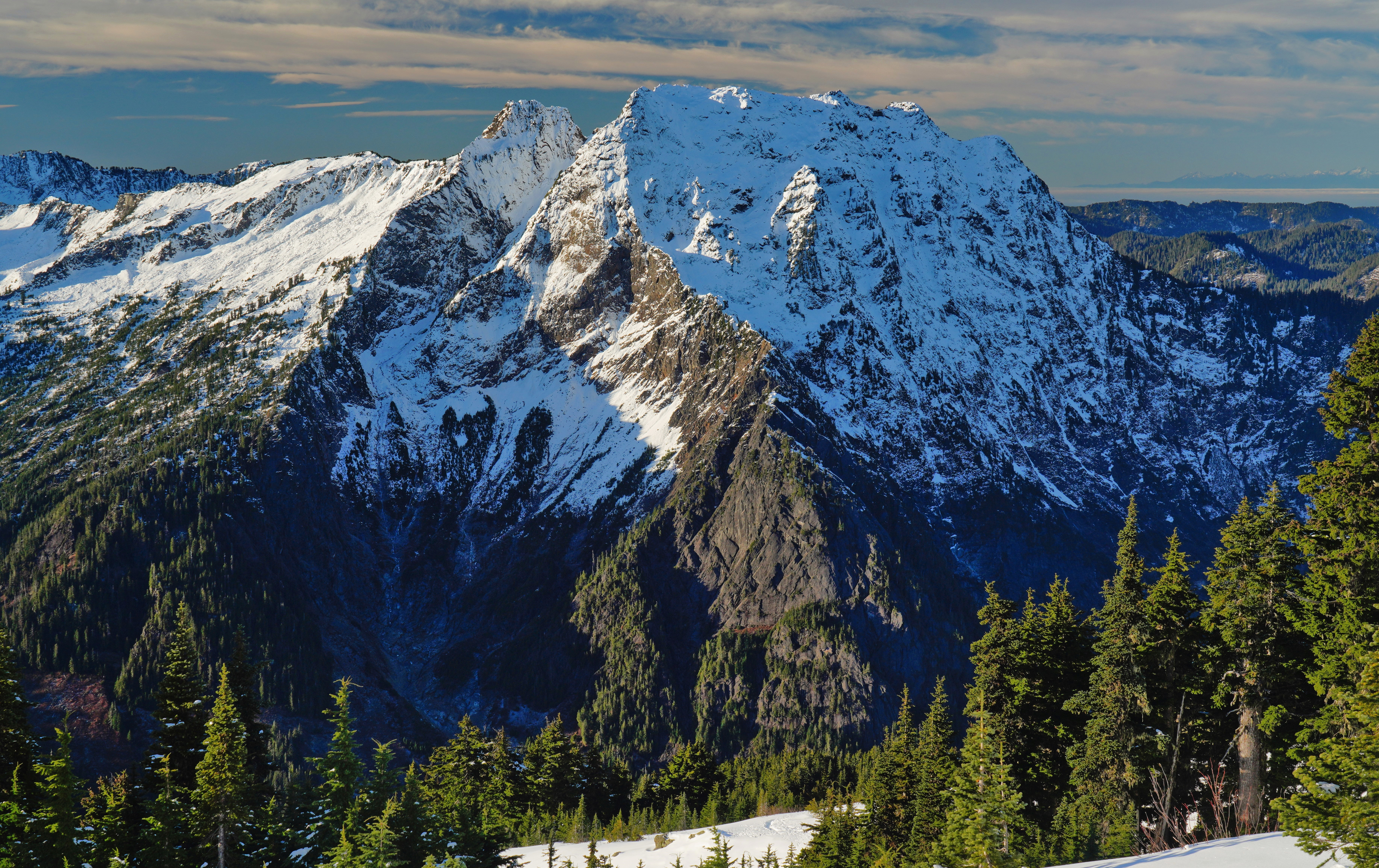
Big Four Mountain viewed from Dickerman Mountain

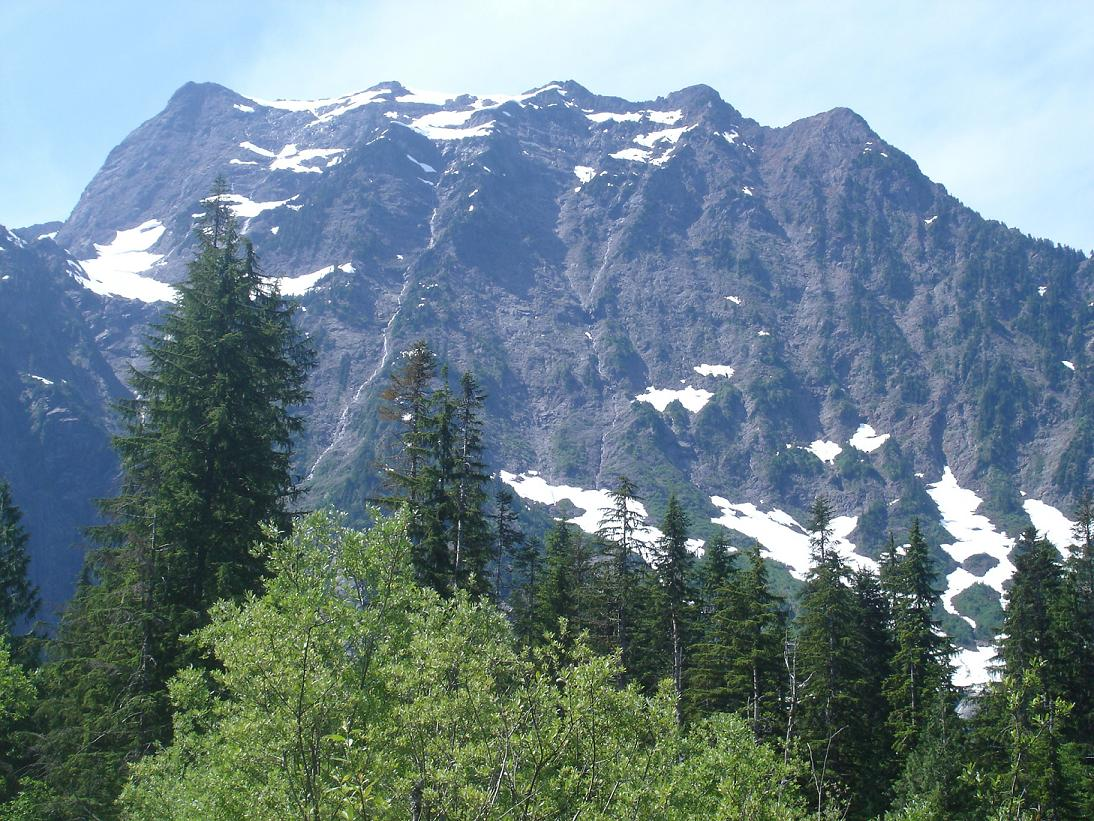

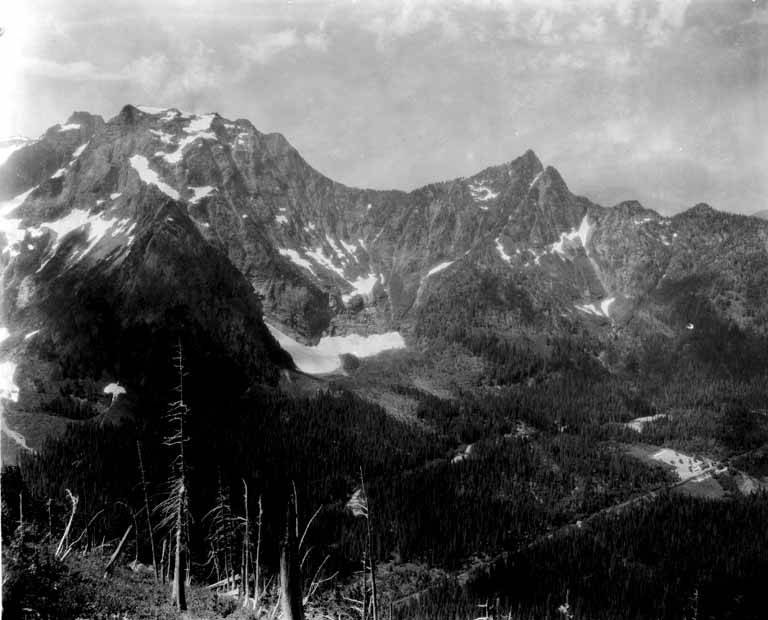
Big Four Mountain with Hall Peak to right, Big Four Inn in lower right. ca 1923

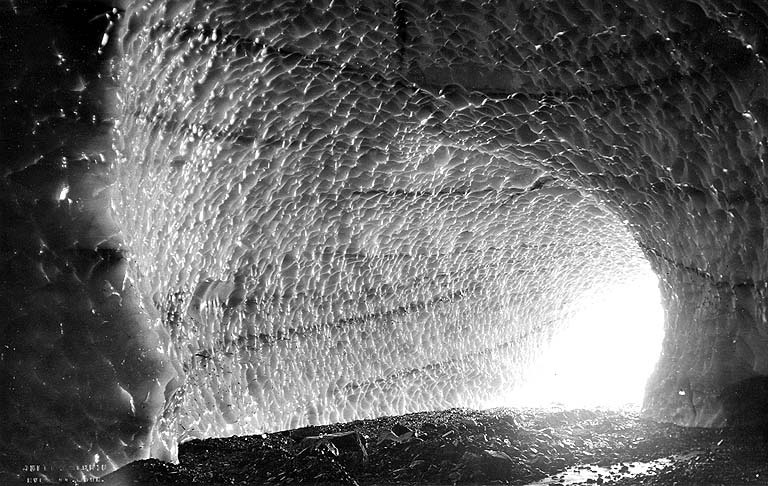
One of Big Four's ice caves, ca. 1920.

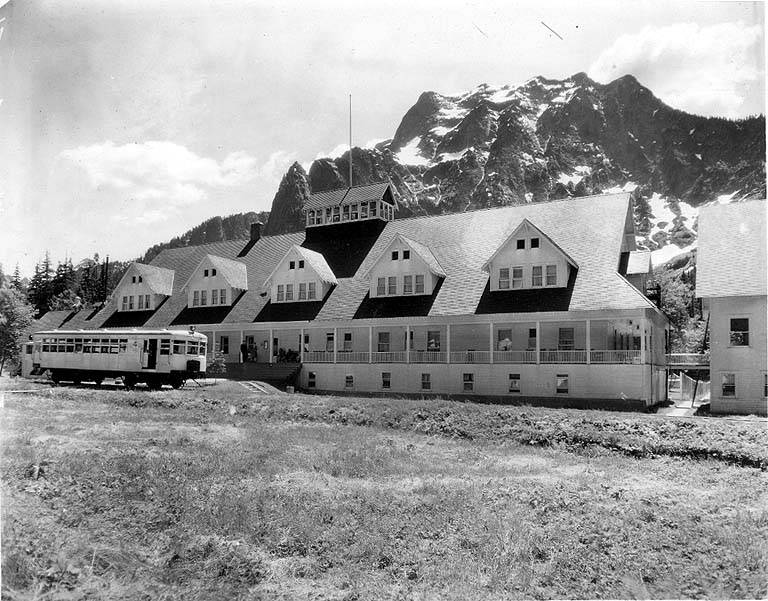
Big Four Inn and mountain

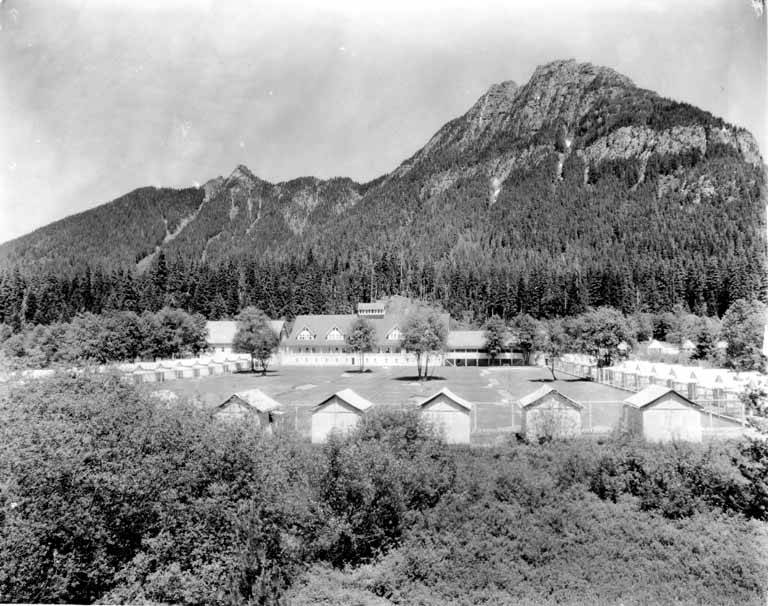
Pemmican Peak, Big Four Inn and cabins

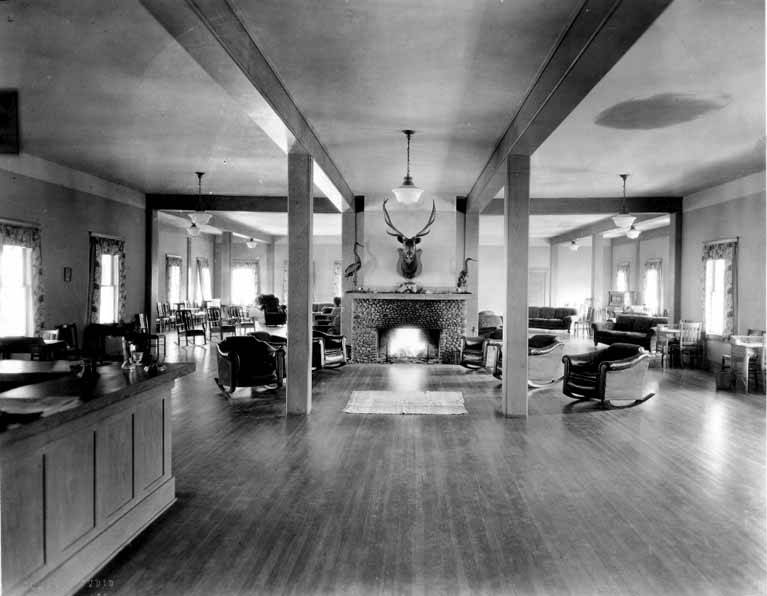
Big Four Inn lobby
