= White Chuck Mountain =

Mountain in Washington (state), United States

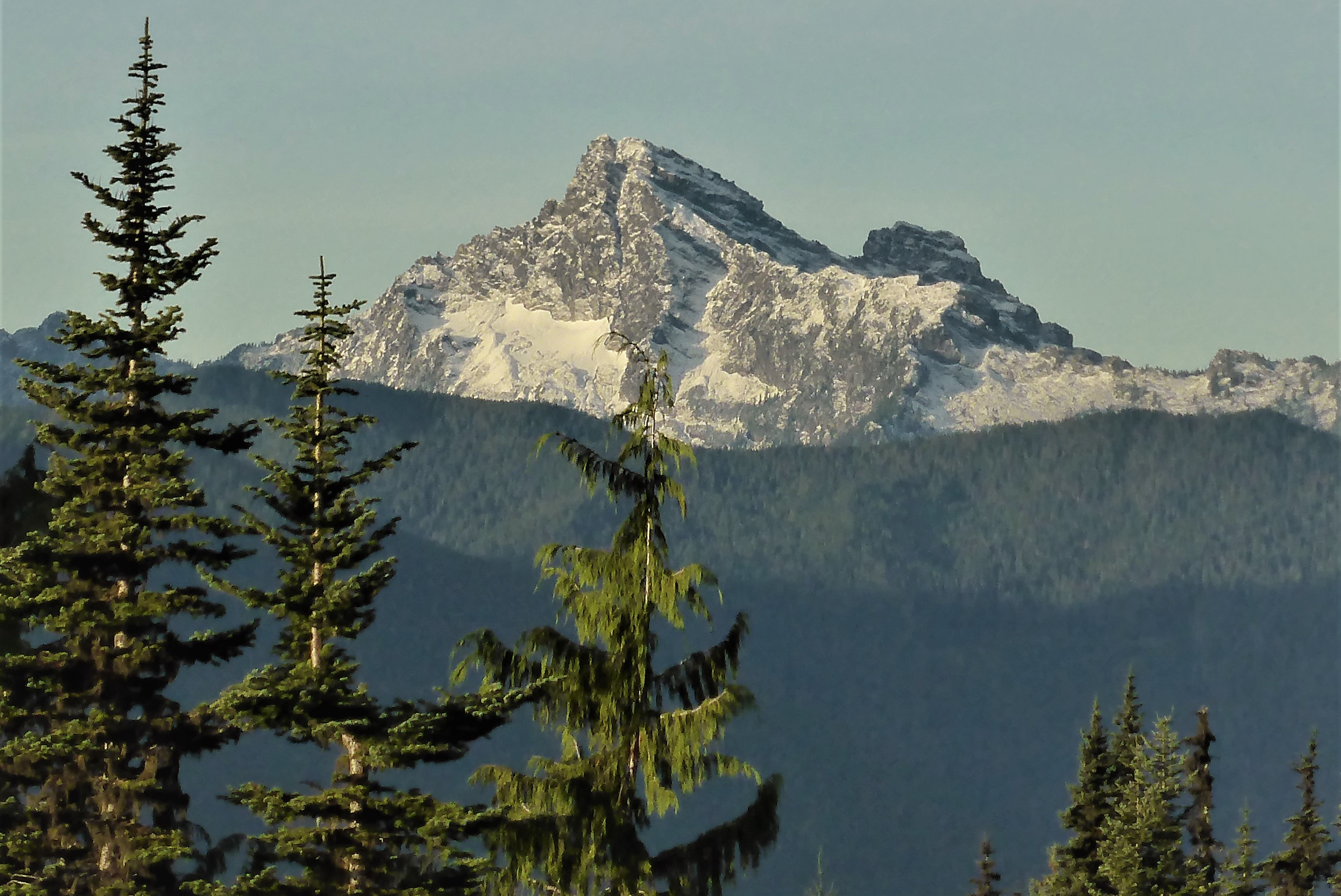
- Northeast aspect, from Green Mountain

Highest point
- Elevation: 6,989 ft (2,130 m)
- Prominence: 3,789 ft (1,155 m)
- Parent peak: Mount Pugh (7,201 ft)
- Isolation: 4.92 mi (7.92 km)
- Coordinates: 48°12′31″N 121°25′01″W

Geography
- Location within Washington (state) Location within the United States
- Interactive map of White Chuck Mountain
- Country: United States
- State: Washington
- County: Snohomish
- Parent range: Cascade Range
- Topo map: USGS White Chuck Mountain

Climbing
- First ascent: July 28, 1897 Albert Hale Sylvester, Thomas Gerdine, Sam Strom

White Chuck Mountain, or native name Hi Khaed, is a 6,989 ft (2,130 m) summit near the western edge of the North Cascades, in Snohomish County of Washington state. It is located southeast of Darrington, Washington, east of the Mountain Loop Highway, and northwest of Glacier Peak, which is one of the Cascade stratovolcanoes. It is situated at the confluence of the White Chuck River and the Sauk River on land administered by the Mount Baker-Snoqualmie National Forest. The mountain is named for the White Chuck River, which "chuck" in Chinook Jargon means "water". The nearest higher neighbor is Mount Pugh, 4.9 miles (7.9 km) to the south-southeast.

== Climate ==
White Chuck Mountain is located in the marine west coast climate zone of western North America. Most weather fronts originating in the Pacific Ocean travel northeast toward the Cascade Mountains. As fronts approach the North Cascades, they are forced upward by the peaks of the Cascade Range (orographic lift), causing them to drop their moisture in the form of rain or snowfall onto the Cascades. As a result, the west side of the North Cascades experiences high precipitation, especially during the winter months in the form of snowfall. Because of maritime influence, snow tends to be wet and heavy, resulting in high avalanche danger. During winter months, weather is usually cloudy, but due to high pressure systems over the Pacific Ocean that intensify during summer months, there is often little or no cloud cover during the summer. Due to its temperate climate and proximity to the Pacific Ocean, areas west of the Cascade Crest very rarely experience temperatures below 0 °F (−18 °C) or above 80 °F (27 °C). The months of July through September offer the most favorable weather for viewing or climbing this peak.

== Geology ==
The North Cascades features some of the most rugged topography in the Cascade Range, with craggy peaks, ridges, and deep glacial valleys. Geological events occurring many years ago created diverse topography and drastic elevation changes over the Cascade Range, leading to various climate differences. These climate differences lead to vegetation variety defining the ecoregions in this area.

The history of the formation of the Cascade Mountains dates back millions of years ago to the late Eocene Epoch. With the North American Plate overriding the Pacific Plate, episodes of volcanic igneous activity persisted. Glacier Peak, a stratovolcano that is 15.5 mi (24.9 km) east-southeast of White Chuck, began forming in the mid-Pleistocene. In addition, small fragments of the oceanic and continental lithosphere called terranes created the North Cascades about 50 million years ago.

During the Pleistocene period dating back over two million years ago, glaciation advancing and retreating repeatedly scoured the landscape, leaving deposits of rock debris. The U-shaped cross section of the river valleys is a result of recent glaciation. Uplift and faulting in combination with glaciation have been the dominant processes which have created the tall peaks and deep valleys of the North Cascades area.

== Gallery ==
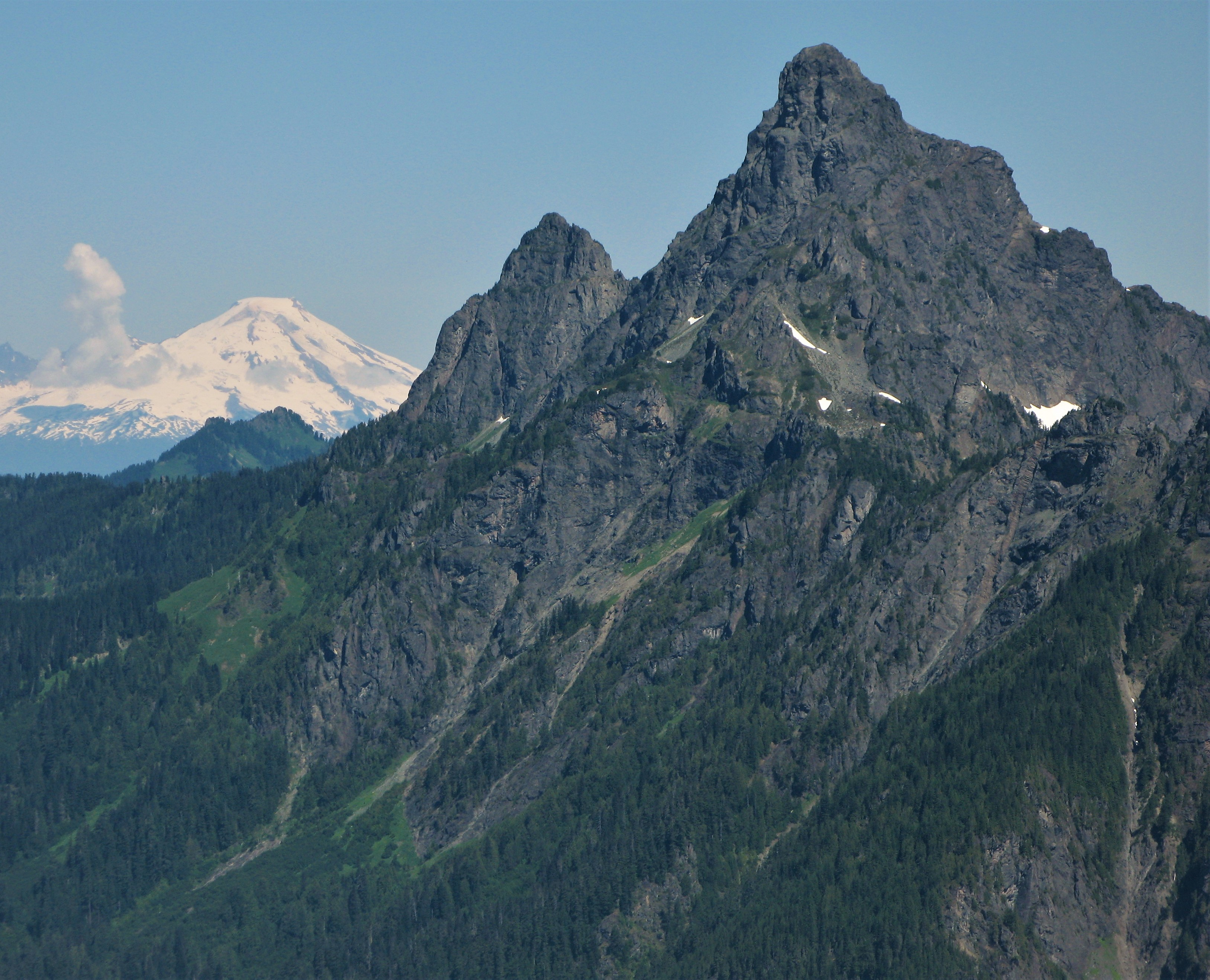
White Chuck from Mt. Pugh
(Mount Baker to left)

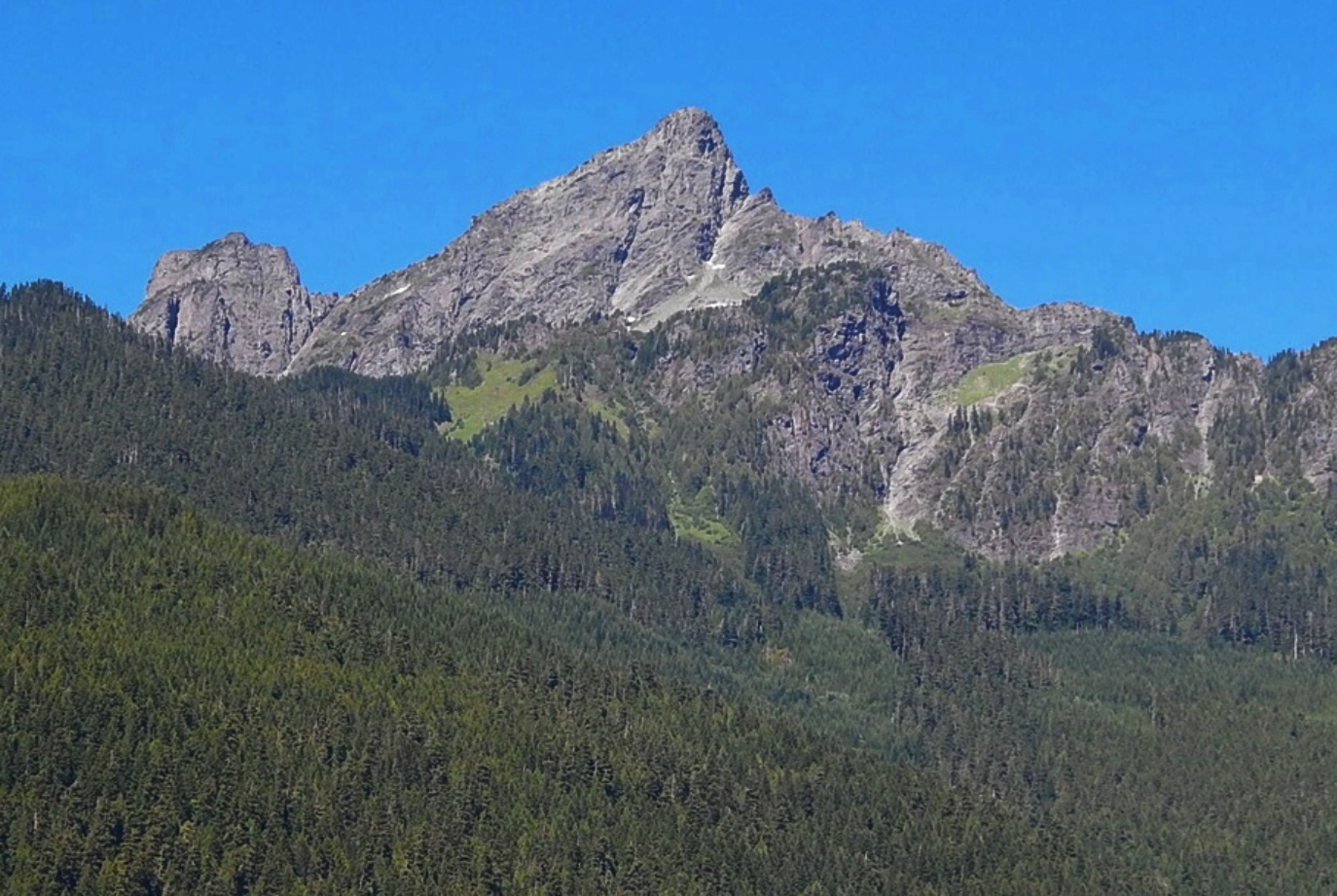
West aspect, from Mountain Loop Highway

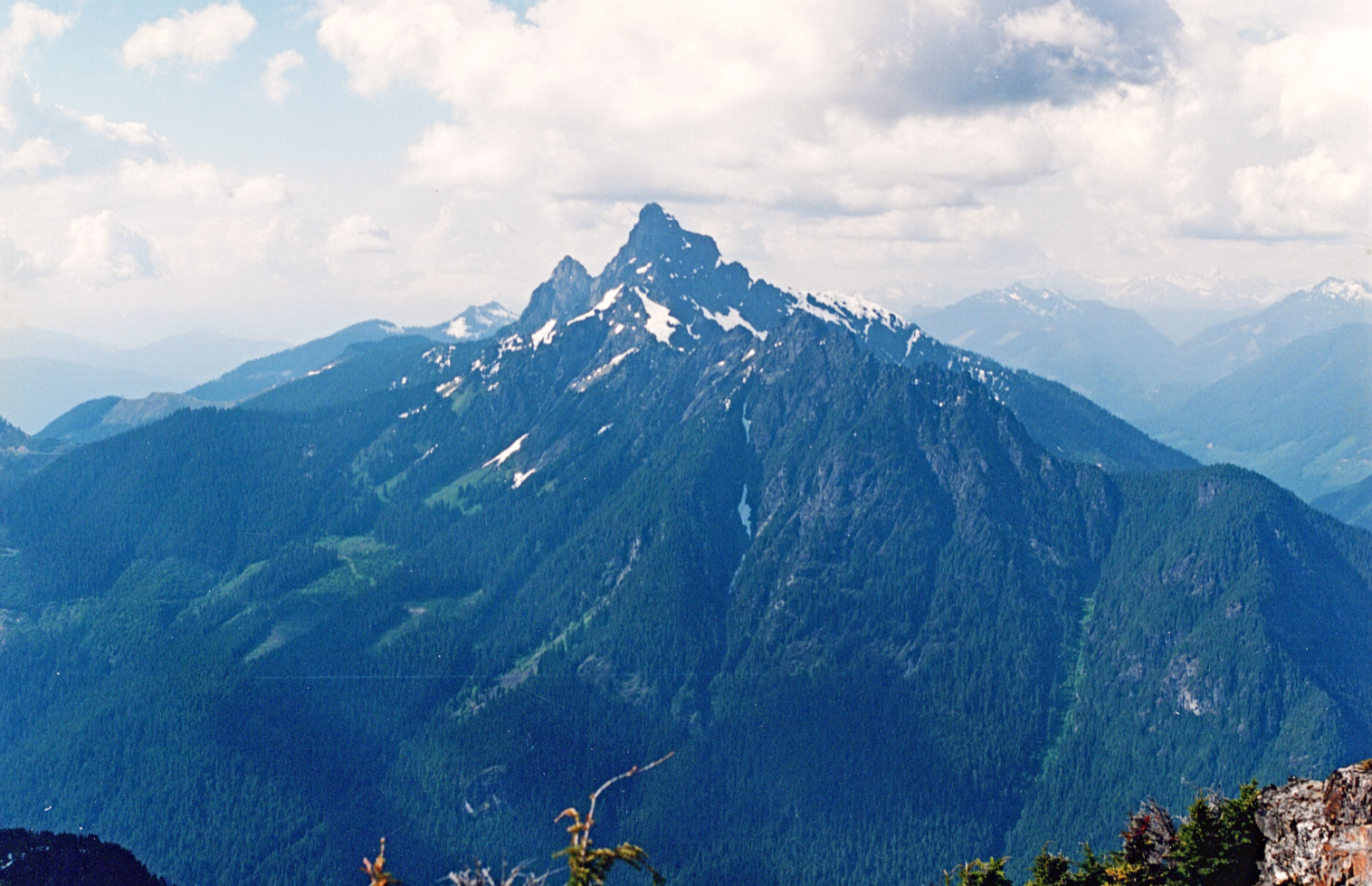
White Chuck seen from Mount Pugh

== See also ==
- Geology of the Pacific Northwest
- Geography of the North Cascades
