= Mineral City, Washington =

Ghost town in Washington (state)

Mineral City, Washington Silver City
- Ghost town
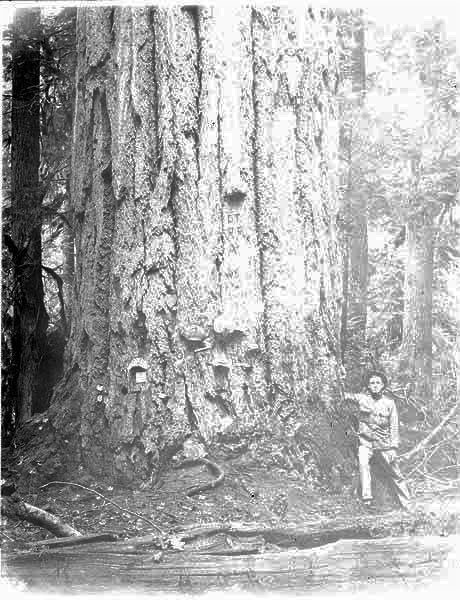
- A 14-foot (4.3-meter) diameter fir tree at Mineral City

- Location within Washington (state)
- Coordinates: 47°57′03″N 121°26′08″W
- Country: United States
- State: Washington
- County: Snohomish
- Settlement of Silver City: 1873
- Establishment of Mineral City: 1892

Mineral City is a ghost town in Snohomish County, Washington.

== Location ==
Mineral City is situated on Silver Creek, four miles (6.4 km) north of Galena. The Silver Creek drainage area is rugged and difficult to navigate. Monte Cristo is accessible to the north via Poodle Dog Pass. Mineral City was established in 1892 on the site of a previous settlement, Silver City, which was established in 1873 by Theron Ferguson (1840-1918), but abandoned by the 1880s.

== History ==
Mineral City lies on a speculated route between the territory of the bəsx̌əx̌əx̌alč band of the Skykomish, based in Index, and the Sauk to the north.

The first mining claims in the area, the Silver Creek Mining District, were located by George White and Hill Tyler in 1871. Hans Hansen recorded the Norwegian Claim along Silver Creek in 1874.

Monte Cristo stakeholders considered building a railway passing through Mineral City to Monte Cristo via a tunnel under or switchback over Poodle Dog Pass, but this was ruled out as too expensive. Later, in 1935, a road was proposed by the Works Progress Administration (WPA) from Mineral City to Monte Cristo. However, this road was never built.

The Silver City Mining Company's boarding house served as a voting precinct in the 1880 presidential election.

Prospector Joseph "Joe" L. Pearsall (1855-?) discovered the more successful Monte Cristo site via Mineral City.

The plat for Mineral City was filed on June 20, 1892 by Elisha Hiram Hubbart (1839-1895). The town site consisted of 15 blocks, and was located in the Anna Quartz mining claim. At its peak, it had 2 hotels, 2 saloons and 2 stores.

After a 1980 storm, a quarter-mile (0.4 km) length of the ridge between Galena and Mineral City collapsed, washing out the road. The route remains impassable by vehicles.
