= Galena, Washington =

Ghost town in Washington (state)

- Ghost town
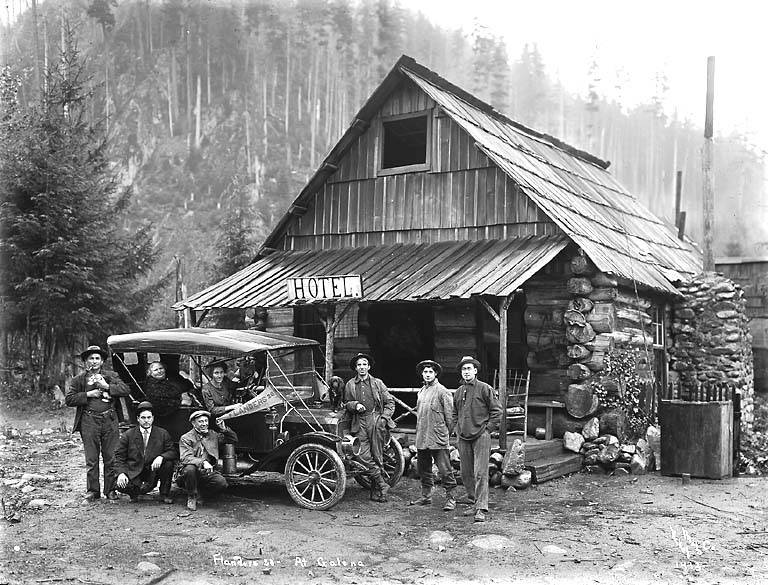
- Crowd with automobile in front of hotel, Galena, 1911.

- Location within Washington (state)
- Coordinates: 47°53′32″N 121°26′36″W
- Country: United States
- State: Washington
- County: Snohomish
- Elevation: 1,079 ft (329 m)
- Time zone: UTC-8 (Pacific (PST))
  - Summer (DST): UTC-7 (PDT)
- Area code(s): 360, 564
- GNIS feature ID: 1519869

Galena is a ghost town in Snohomish County, Washington. Galena is located in the Cascade Mountains, northeast of the town of Index. North of Galena lies Mineral City.

== History ==
Galena lies on a speculated route between the territory of the bəsx̌əx̌əx̌əlč band of the Skykomish people, based in modern-day Index, and the Sauk to the north.

Galena was platted in December 1891 by John N. Scott. By then, Galena was already the location of much mineral interest, and it received mail three days a week and stagecoach service twice a week.

From April 1892 to August 1894, Galena was home to the Inter-Cascade Mountaineer, a weekly mining newspaper.

Voting returns from the Galena and Monte Cristo precincts were at the center of a minor controversy during the contentious 1894 county seat election between Snohomish and Everett.

In 1894, Snohomish County appropriated $500 to improve a wagon road between Index and Galena. The road was also extended beyond Galena, up Silver Creek.

After a 1980 storm, a quarter-mile length of the ridge between Galena and Mineral City collapsed, washing out the road. Snohomish County Public Works reopened Index-Galena Rd from milepost 6 - 7 in November 2023.

The county road from Index to Galena was completed in 1911. In 2006, severe flooding washed Index-Galena Road out, and access to Galena was limited to a 40-mile detour which closed seasonally.

In November 2023, the Index–Galena Road reopened to traffic. The project cost $29 million, most of which came from the Federal Highway Administration; Snohomish County contributed $6.3 million and the state government contributed $1.2 million.

== Geology ==
Galena is within the Silver Creek Mining District. The area immediately local to Galena contains silver-lead ore, with a smaller amount of chalcopyrite, which contains gold.
