= Cortinarius barlowensis =

Scientific classification
- Kingdom: Fungi
- Division: Basidiomycota
- Class: Agaricomycetes
- Order: Agaricales
- Family: Cortinariaceae
- Genus: Cortinarius
- Species: C. barlowensis

Binomial name
- Cortinarius barlowensis Ammirati, Berbee, Harrower, Liimat. & Niskanen

Species of fungus

Cortinarius barlowensis
- Mycological characteristics
- Gills on hymenium
- Cap is convex or umbonate
- Hymenium is adnexed
- Stipe has a cortina
- Ecology is mycorrhizal
- Edibility is unknown

Cortinarius barlowensis is a species of mushroom in the family Cortinariaceae. It is uncommon.

== Description ==
The cap of Cortinarius barlowensis is grayish brown in color. It can be convex or umbonate, and is about 1.9-3 centimeters in diameter. The stipe is about 5-10 centimeters long and 0.3-0.5 centimeters wide, and is slightly wider at the base. It is bluish, purplish, or grayish. The gills are purplish to brown, and are adnexed.

== Habitat and ecology ==
Cortinarius barlowensis is found under conifers in old growth forests. It is often found at low elevations. The type locality is Barlow Pass, Washington State, United States.
