= Mountain Loop Highway =

Highway in Washington, United States

Mountain Loop Highway
- Forest Route 20, Mountain Loop Scenic Byway
- A map of the Mountain Loop Highway with paved sections highlighted in red and the unpaved section highlighted in blue

Route information
- Maintained by Snohomish County and USFS
- Length: 54 mi (87 km) Includes 14-mile (23 km) unpaved section
- Existed: March 23, 1936 (Construction begins); December 1941 (Highway opened)–present

Major junctions
- West end: SR 92 in Granite Falls
- East end: SR 530 in Darrington

Location
- Country: United States
- State: Washington

Highway system
- Forest Highway System; State highways in Washington; Interstate; US; State; Scenic; Pre-1964; 1964 renumbering; Former

The Mountain Loop Highway is a scenic byway in the U.S. state of Washington. It traverses the western section of the Cascade Range within Snohomish County. The name suggests it forms a full loop, but it only is a small portion of a loop, which is completed using State Routes 92, 9, and 530. Part of the highway is also a designated and signed Forest Highway, and is known as Forest Route 20.

The highway connects the towns of Granite Falls and Darrington. It is paved for 34 miles (55 km) from Granite Falls to Barlow Pass (2349') where the highway becomes unpaved for 13 miles (21 km), and then paved again for the remaining 9 miles (14 km) to Darrington. The unpaved section is U.S. Forest Service Road #20 and passes several USFS campgrounds. Portions of the unpaved section are often closed for periods of several years due to flood damage.

Between Granite Falls and Barlow Pass, the highway passes Big Four Mountain and the trailhead leading to the Big Four Ice Caves at its base. At Barlow Pass, a gravel road maintained by Snohomish County (closed to motor vehicles) branches from the highway and leads to the former silver mining town of Monte Cristo. The portion from Granite Falls to Barlow Pass follows the Stillaguamish River. The portion from Barlow Pass to Darrington follows the Sauk River. The "inside" of the highway's namesake loop is a large area containing significant Cascade peaks, including Three Fingers (6,850 ft; 2,090 m), Whitehorse Mountain (6,850 ft; 2,090 m), Mount Dickerman (5,723 ft; 1,744 m), and Mount Forgotten (6,005 ft; 1,830 m).

== Route description ==
=== Paved segment 1 ===
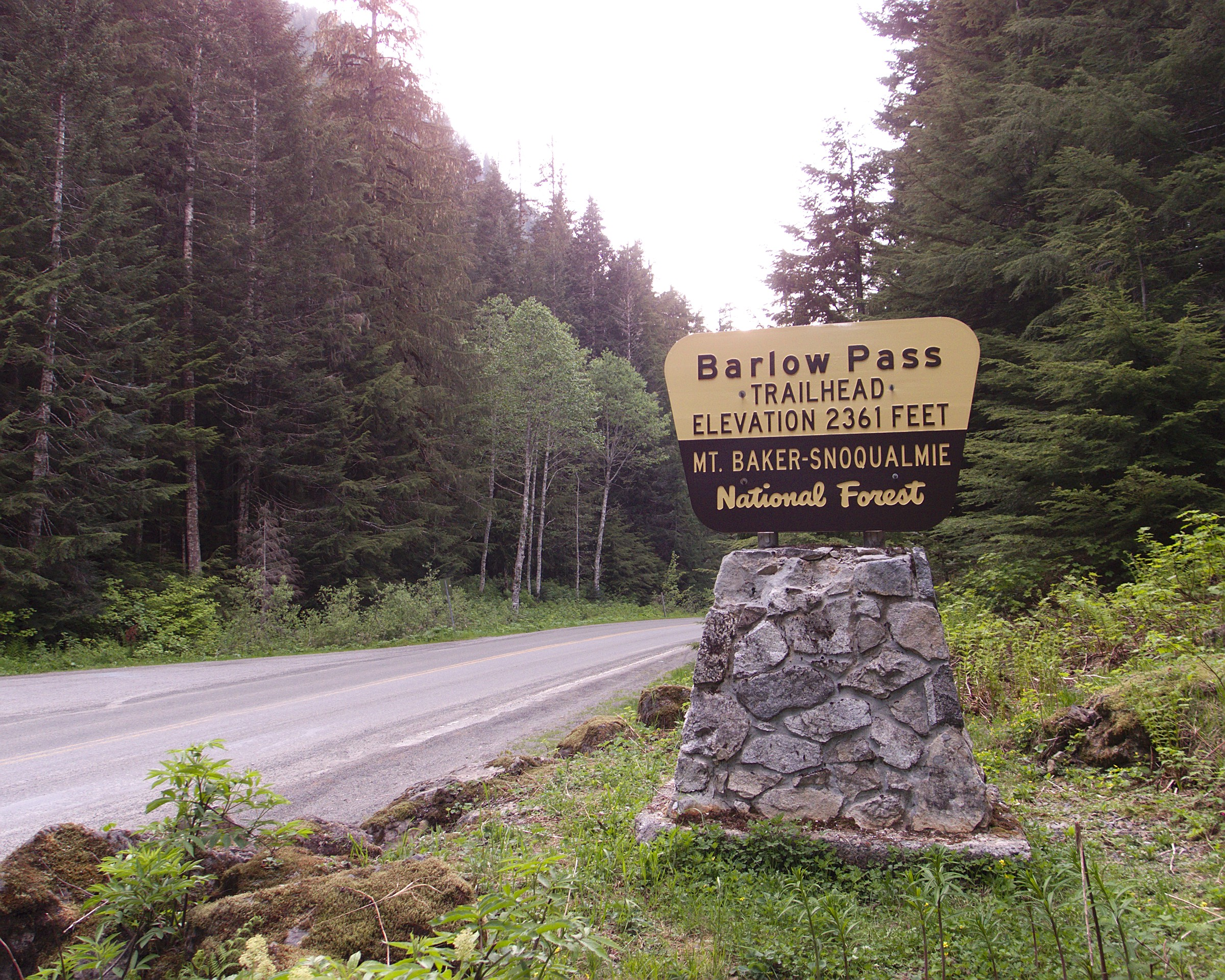
Barlow Pass, near the end of the first paved section

The Mountain Loop Highway starts at the eastern end of SR 92 in Downtown Granite Falls. Within Downtown Granite Falls, SR 92 is called E Stanley Street and the Mountain Loop Highway is known called N Alder Street. The highway goes north away from Granite Falls and turns east at the point where the road meets the South Fork of the Stillaguamish River. From there, the road roughly follows the river and intersects some Forest Routes such as FR 4201, FR 4018, FR 4020, FR 4037, FR 4052, and FR 4059 while traversing the communities of Robe, Verlot, and Silverton before the river ends. The loop continues and intersects a private road that connects the highway to the Old Monte Cristo Townsite, which is located 4 miles east of Barlow Pass.

=== Unpaved segment ===
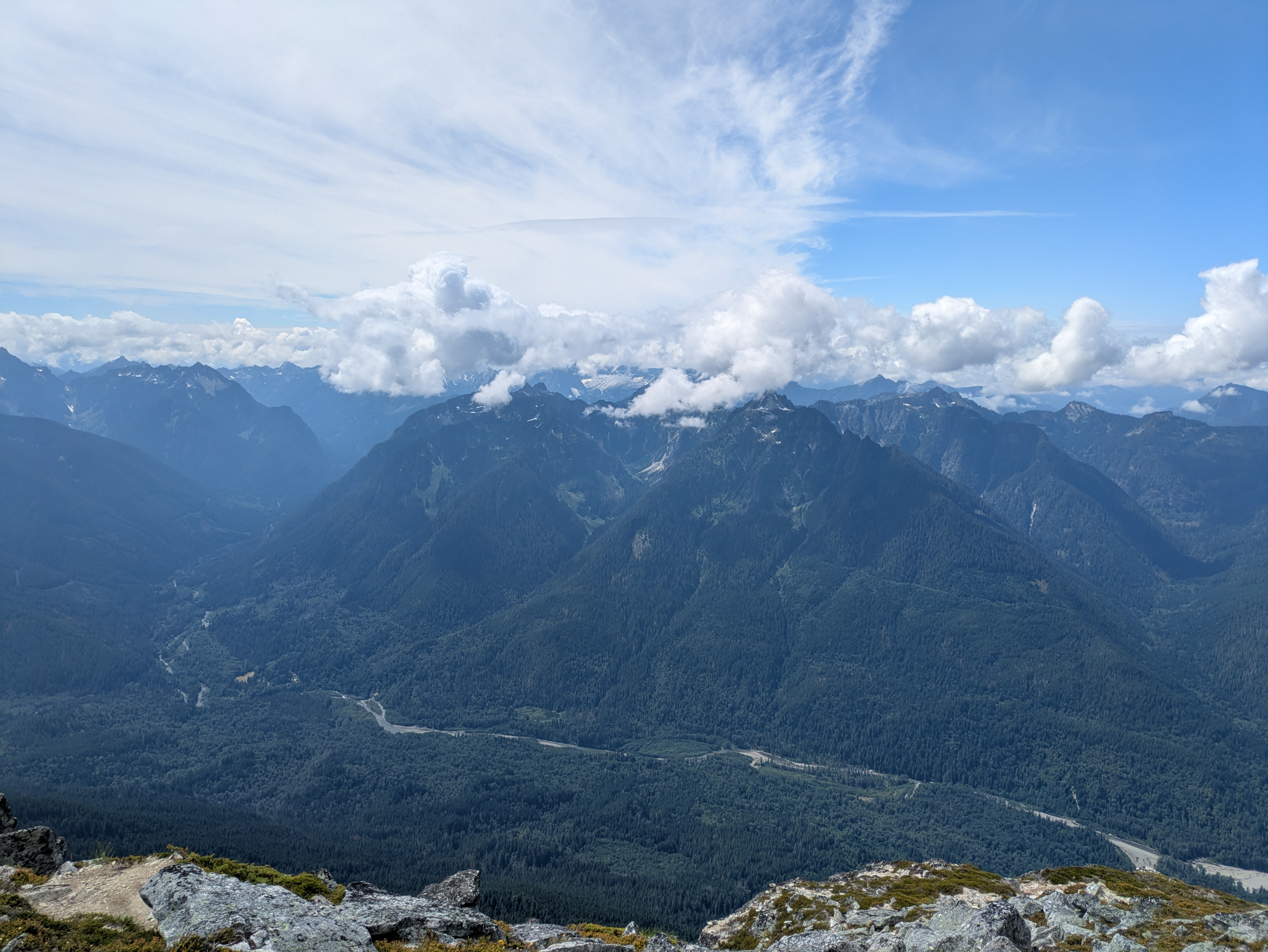
Mountain Loop Highway seen from Mount Pugh

At Barlow Pass, the Mountain Loop Highway goes north, and becomes unpaved Forest Route 20 or FR 20. Shortly after becoming unpaved, FR 20 starts to follow the Sauk River towards Darrington. FR 20 goes northward past Bedal, and it becomes paved again at the new Whitechuck bridge (approximately mile marker 44).

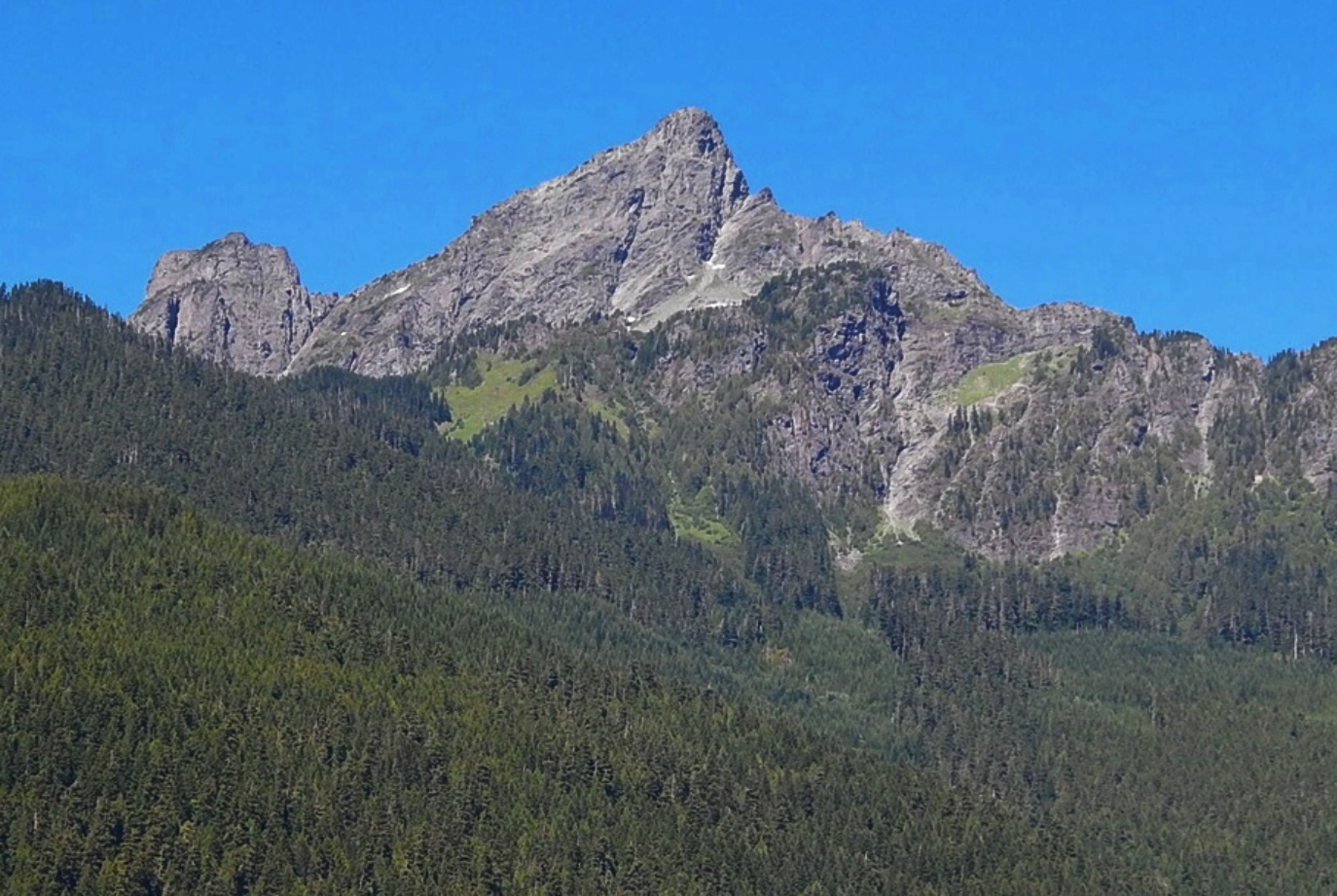
White Chuck Mountain seen from designated pullout along the highway

=== Paved segment 2 ===
From Whitechuck, the Mountain Loop Highway continues north along the Sauk River. On the opposite side of the river, the N. Sauk River Road (Forest Route 22) parallels the route of the Mountain Loop Highway. The loop enters Darrington, where Railroad Avenue splits from the highway to become a short bypass to the eastern end of the highway. The highway ends at SR 530.

== History ==
The Mountain Loop Highway was established on March 23, 1936. Before the highway was built, primitive and very rough wagon roads connected the Monte Cristo Townsite with the small towns of Darrington and Granite Falls. A narrow wagon road, known as Wilmans Trail or Pioneer Trail, or simply the Sauk wagon road, was built from Sauk City on the Skagit River to Monte Cristo in 1891. That same year, the surveyor M.Q. Barlow discovered the feasibility of access to Monte Cristo via the South Fork Stillaguamish River. Mining interests funded a wagon road from Silverton to the Sauk wagon road via Barlow Pass. These roads roughly followed the current route of the Mountain Loop Highway along with some railroads. Construction of the road started in 1936 and finished in 1941. The road was closed in 1942 due to the World War II.

The highway closes mostly in the winter due to floods and reopens in the spring of the following year, but a flood in 2003 closed the highway. With other windstorms following in 2006 and 2007, the highway had to be closed until 2008.

The Mountain Loop Highway officially reopened on June 25, 2008, and the cities along the full loop (Arlington, Granite Falls, and Darrington) had a large celebration.

== Major intersections ==
The entire highway is in Snohomish County.

Location	mi	km	Destinations	Notes
Granite Falls	0	0.0	SR 92 west – Lake Stevens	Western end
Barlow Pass	34	55	Barlow Pass	
			East end of paved road Southern end of Forest Route 20	
			Southern end of paved road Northern end of Forest Route 20	
Bedal	47	76	North Sauk River Road	
Darrington	51.5	82.9	To SR 530 west (via Railroad Avenue)	Bypass to SR 530
Darrington	52	84	SR 530 north – Rockport	Eastern end, continuation as SR 530 north
1.000 mi = 1.609 km; 1.000 km = 0.621 mi

== Related routes ==
- Washington State Route 92
- Washington State Route 530
