= Silverton, Washington =

Unincorporated community in Washington, United States

- Unincorporated community
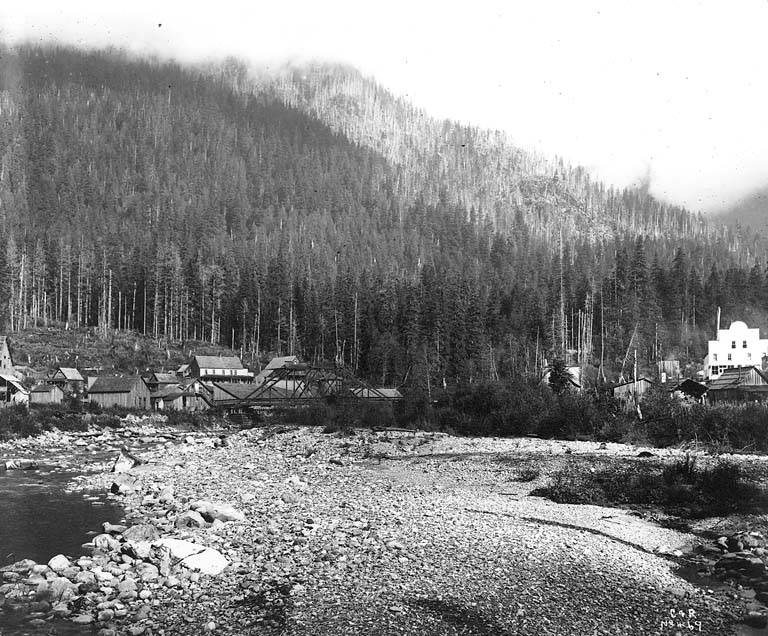
- Silverton, 1906

- Location within Washington (state) Location within the United States
- Coordinates: 48°04′42″N 121°34′01″W
- Country: United States
- State: Washington
- County: Snohomish
- Time zone: UTC-8 (Pacific (PST))
  - Summer (DST): UTC-7 (PDT)

Silverton is an unincorporated community in Snohomish County, in the U.S. state of Washington.

== History ==
A post office called Silverton was established in 1892, and remained in operation until 1945. Silverton was named by the local miners. The Silverton Ranger District, a unit of the Mount Baker National Forest, was established in 1908 and closed in 1936 before the completion of the Mountain Loop Highway. The ranger station was re-used for an educational nature camp, named Camp Silverton, that was operated by private groups and Everett Public Schools until 1997. The camp was demolished in 2019.
