= Big Four Ice Caves =

Mountain with the lowest glacier in the continental United States

Coordinates: 48.0539°N 121.5196°W

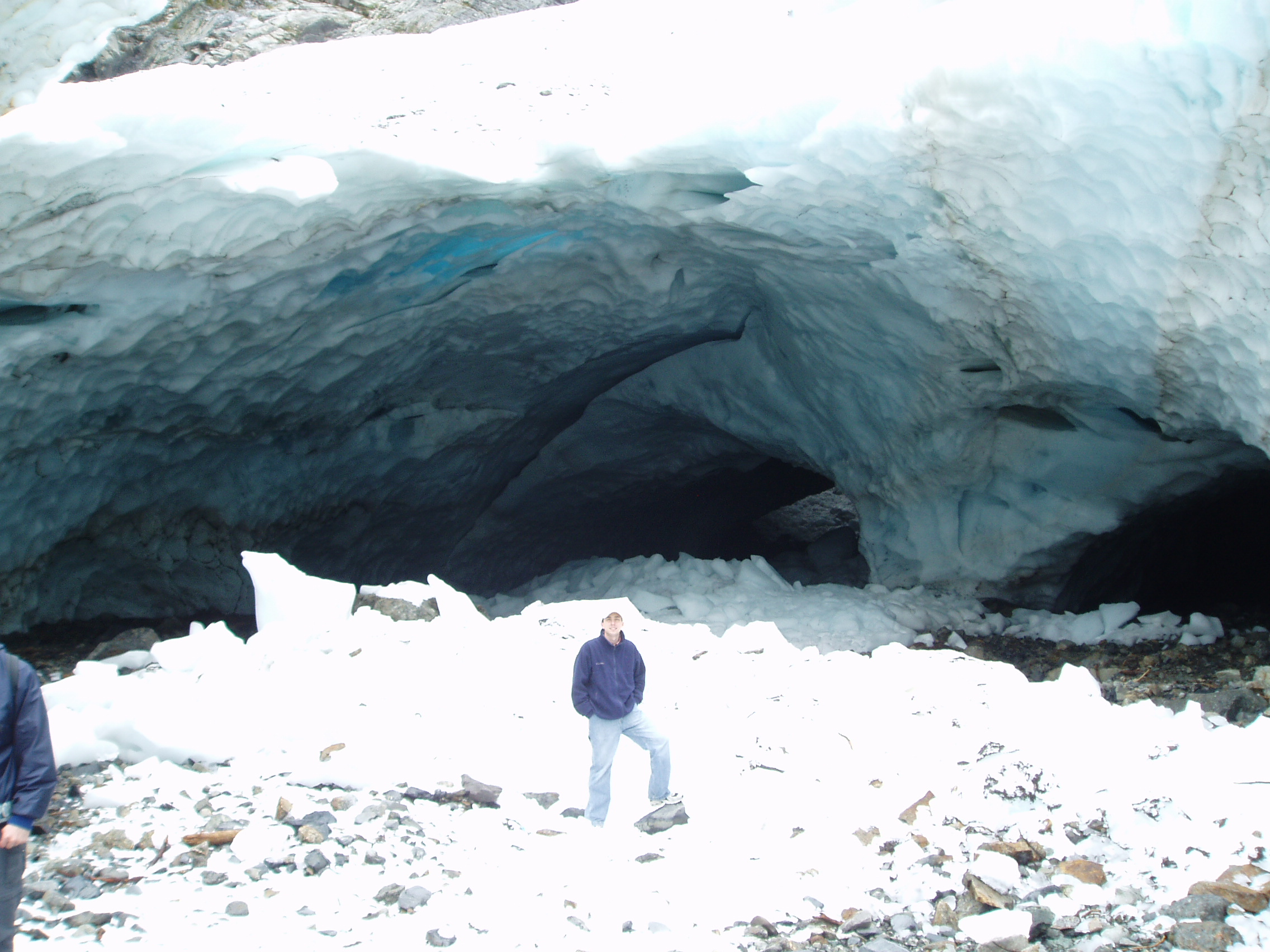
One of Big Four's ice caves, ca. 2005

Big Four Mountain is a mountain in the Cascade Range of Washington, located 21 miles (34 km) east of Granite Falls. The mountain is about 6,180 ft (1,880 m) high. At the bottom of its steep, 4,200 ft (1,300 m) high north face, debris piles form from avalanches, and these may remain there year-round because of the permanent shade provided by the mountain. During the summer, snowmelt streams flow beneath the debris piles and form caves in the ice.

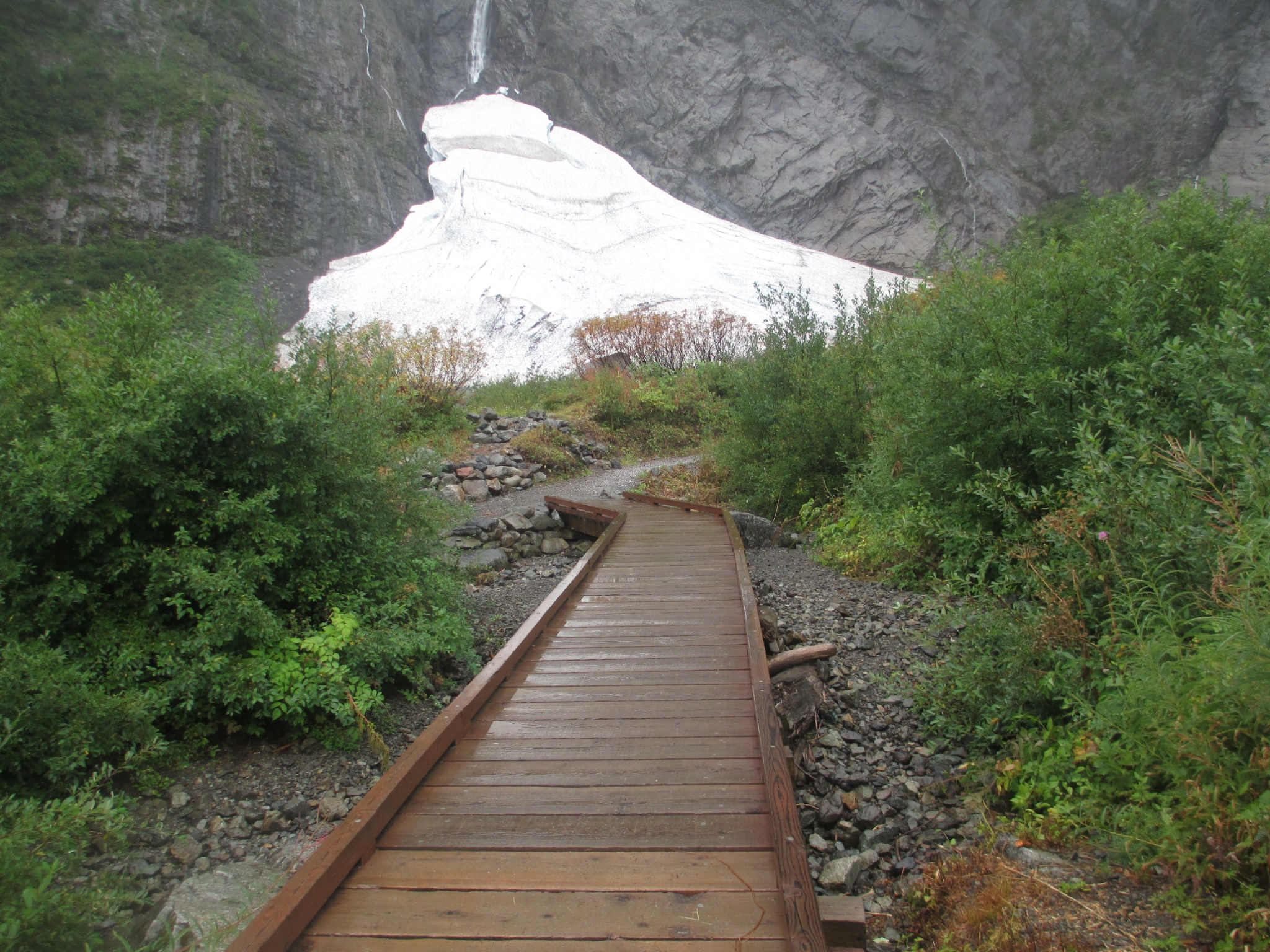
The trail

== Ice caves trail ==
The Big Four Ice Caves Trail, a designated National Recreation Trail, (#723) is one of the most popular hikes in the Mount Baker-Snoqualmie National Forest, attracting over 50,000 visitors per year. There are often several hundred hikers per day, and the trailhead's two separate parking areas are often filled beyond capacity; occasionally forcing hikers to park along neighboring Mountain Loop Road.

A severe autumn storm in November 2006 caused flooding of the South Fork Stillaguamish River, destroying a major footbridge to the Big Four Ice Caves. The cost of replacing the damaged span was estimated at $425,000, and repairs were completed in June 2009. While the trail is open to the public, the snowfield itself was closed temporarily due to cave-ins and slides which have killed four hikers in incidents in 1998, 2010, and in 2015. Because of the danger, hikers are advised to stay out of the caves, and are monitored by forest rangers.

The footbridge's supports were damaged by erosion, resulting in its closure in 2019 for long-term repairs. It reopened in November 2022.
