= Mount Pugh =

Mountain in Washington (state), United States

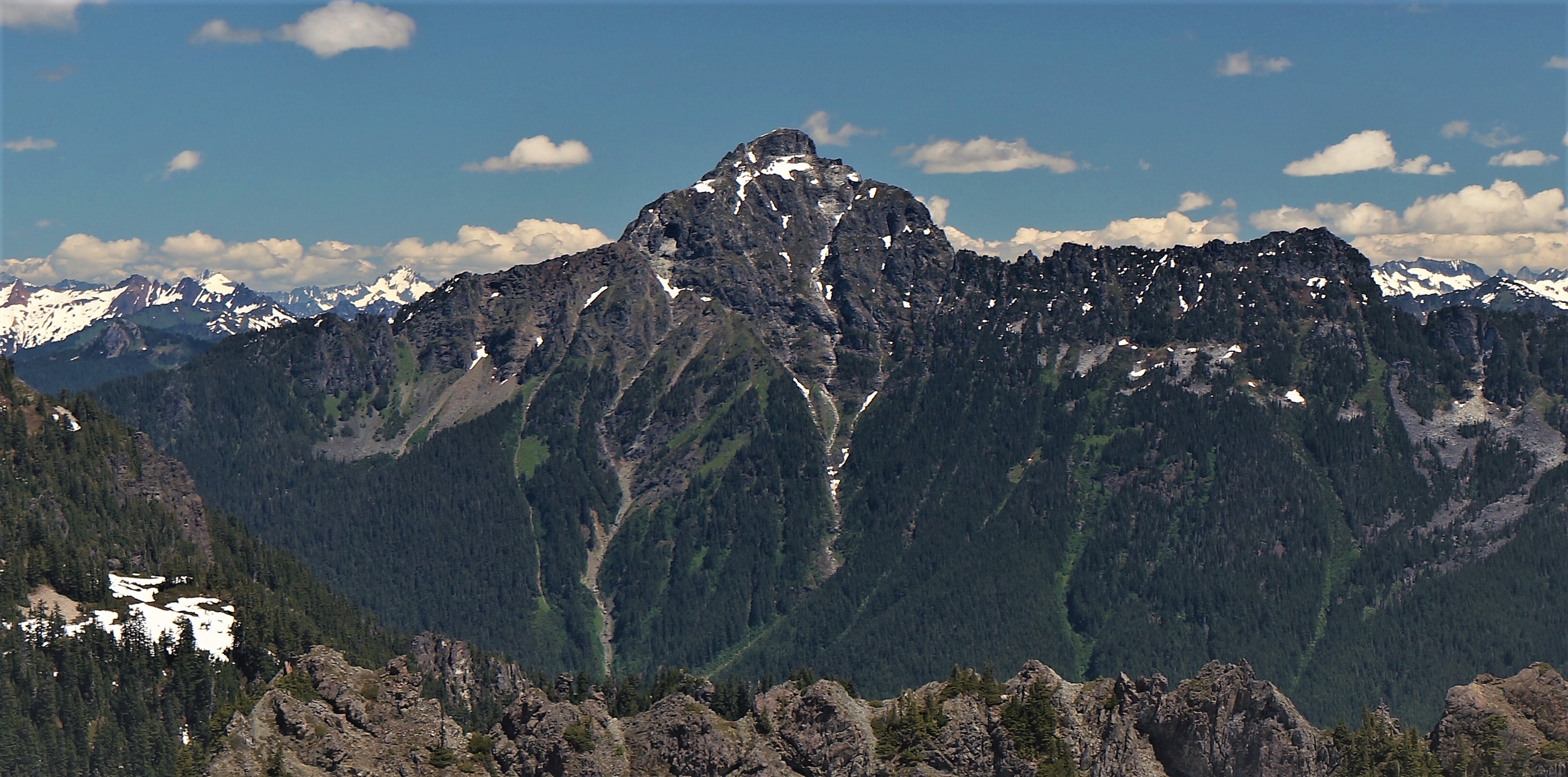

Highest point
- Elevation: 7,201 ft (2,195 m)
- Prominence: 2,801 ft (854 m)
- Coordinates: 48°08′35″N 121°22′28″W

Geography
- Location within Washington (state) Location within the United States
- Interactive map of Mount Pugh
- Location: Snohomish County, Washington, U.S.
- Parent range: Cascade Range
- Topo map: USGS Pugh Mountain

Climbing
- First ascent: 1916 by Nels Bruseth
- Easiest route: Scramble, class 2-3

Mount Pugh (or Pugh Mountain, or native name Da Klagwats) is a peak near the western edge of the North Cascades, in Washington state. It is located 12.2 miles (19.6 km) west of Glacier Peak, one of the Cascade stratovolcanoes. It rises out of the confluence of the White Chuck River (on the north) and the Sauk River (on the southwest), giving it very low footings. For example, it rises 6,150 feet (1,875 m) above the Sauk River Valley in just over 2 horizontal miles (3.2 km); its rise over the White Chuck River is almost as dramatic. The mountain is named for John Pugh, who settled nearby, in 1891.

According to Fred Beckey, "Nels Bruseth apparently made the first ascent in 1916". Earlier unrecorded ascents, including possibly much earlier Native American ascents, are possibilities, since the easiest ascent route is non-technical.

The trail to the summit is easily negotiable most of the way but the last 1.5 miles (2.4 km) is along a razorback ridge with significant exposure. Two people died in falls in 2022 and 2026. This is the Northwest Ridge, Trail Number 644, which actually starts in the Sauk River Valley on the southwest side of the mountain. The total elevation gain is almost exactly one mile (5,280 ft or 1,609 m).

== Climate ==
Mount Pugh is located in the marine west coast climate zone of western North America. Most weather fronts originate in the Pacific Ocean, and travel northeast toward the Cascade Mountains. As fronts approach the North Cascades, they are forced upward by the peaks of the Cascade Range (Orographic lift), causing them to drop their moisture in the form of rain or snowfall onto the Cascades. As a result, the west side of the North Cascades experiences high precipitation, especially during the winter months in the form of snowfall. Due to its temperate climate and proximity to the Pacific Ocean, areas west of the Cascade Crest very rarely experience temperatures below 0 °F (−18 °C) or above 80 °F (27 °C). During winter months, weather is usually cloudy, but, due to high pressure systems over the Pacific Ocean that intensify during summer months, there is often little or no cloud cover during the summer. Because of maritime influence, snow tends to be wet and heavy, resulting in high avalanche danger.

== Geology ==
The North Cascades features some of the most rugged topography in the Cascade Range with craggy peaks, ridges, and deep glacial valleys. Geological events occurring many years ago created the diverse topography and drastic elevation changes over the Cascade Range leading to the various climate differences.

The history of the formation of the Cascade Mountains dates back millions of years ago to the late Eocene Epoch. With the North American Plate overriding the Pacific Plate, episodes of volcanic igneous activity persisted. In addition, small fragments of the oceanic and continental lithosphere called terranes created the North Cascades about 50 million years ago.

During the Pleistocene period dating back over two million years ago, glaciation advancing and retreating repeatedly scoured the landscape leaving deposits of rock debris. The U-shaped cross section of the river valleys is a result of recent glaciation. Uplift and faulting in combination with glaciation have been the dominant processes which have created the tall peaks and deep valleys of the North Cascades area.

== See also ==
- Geography of Washington (state)
- Geology of the Pacific Northwest

== Gallery ==
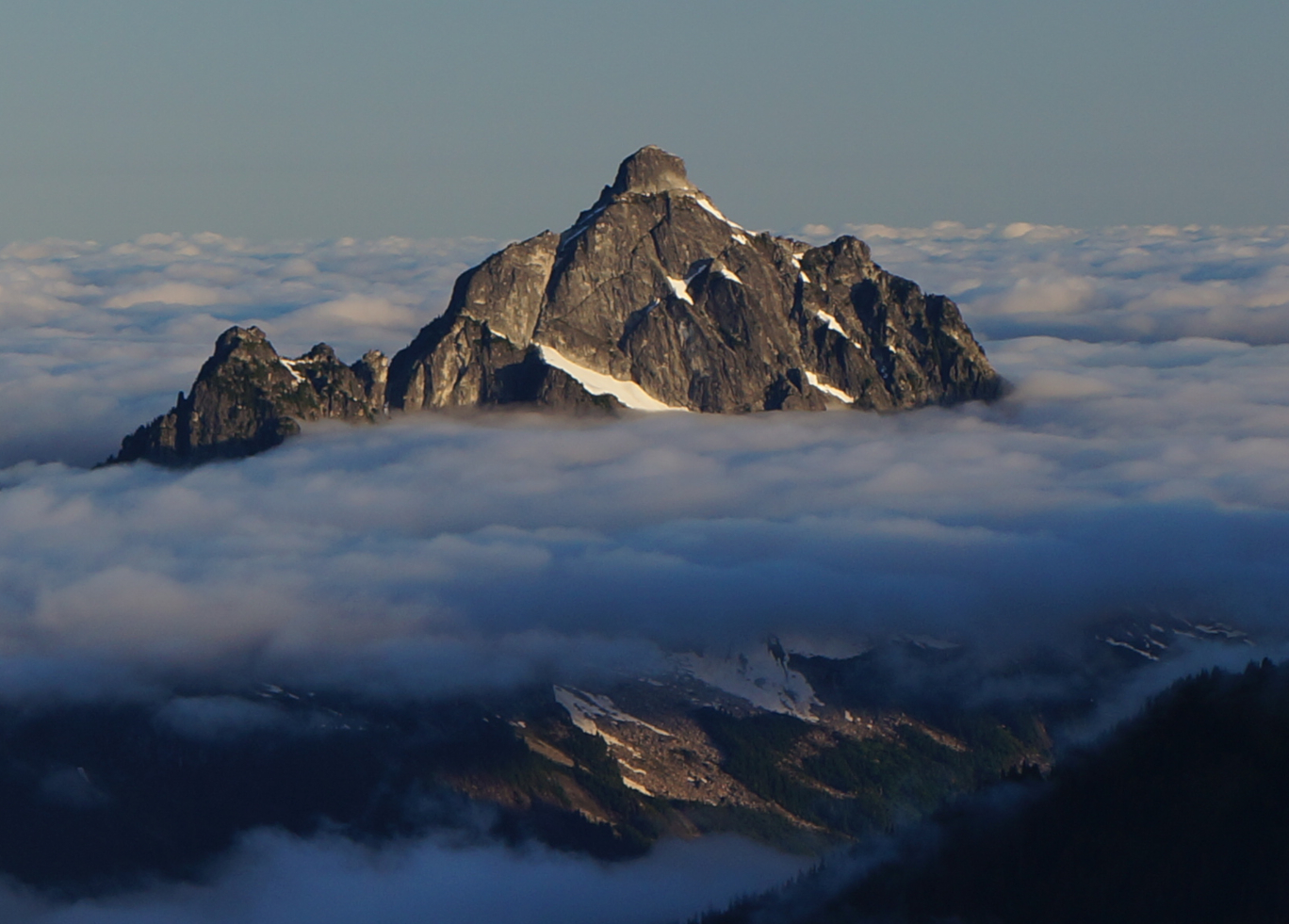
Pugh from Painted Mountain

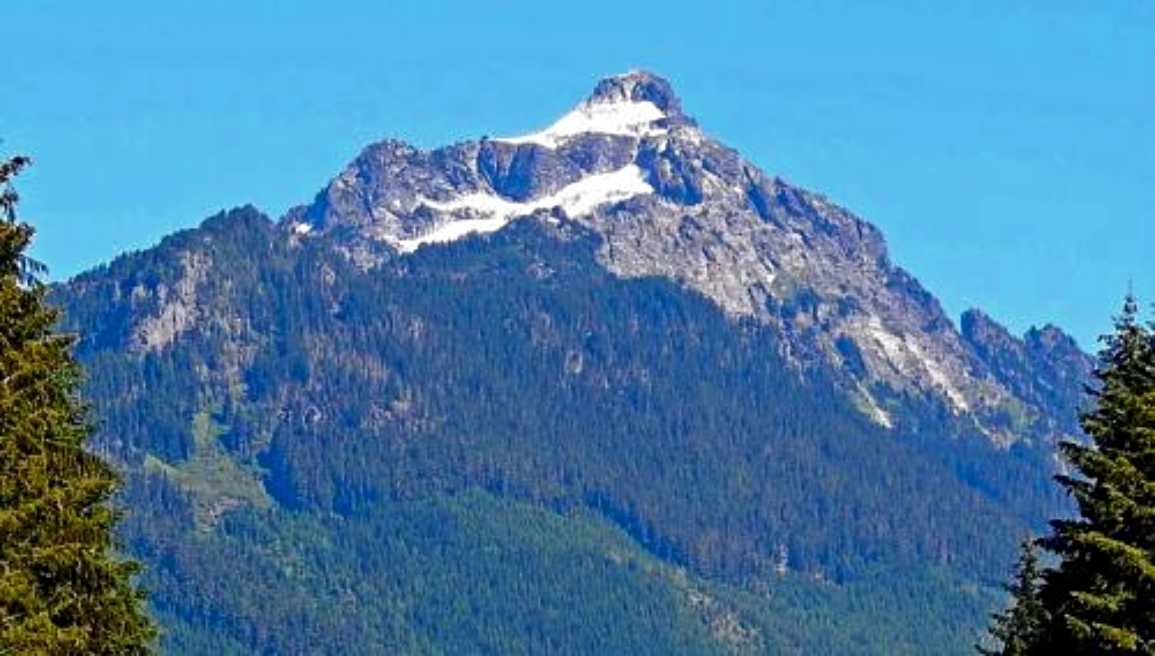
Pugh from Mountain Loop road

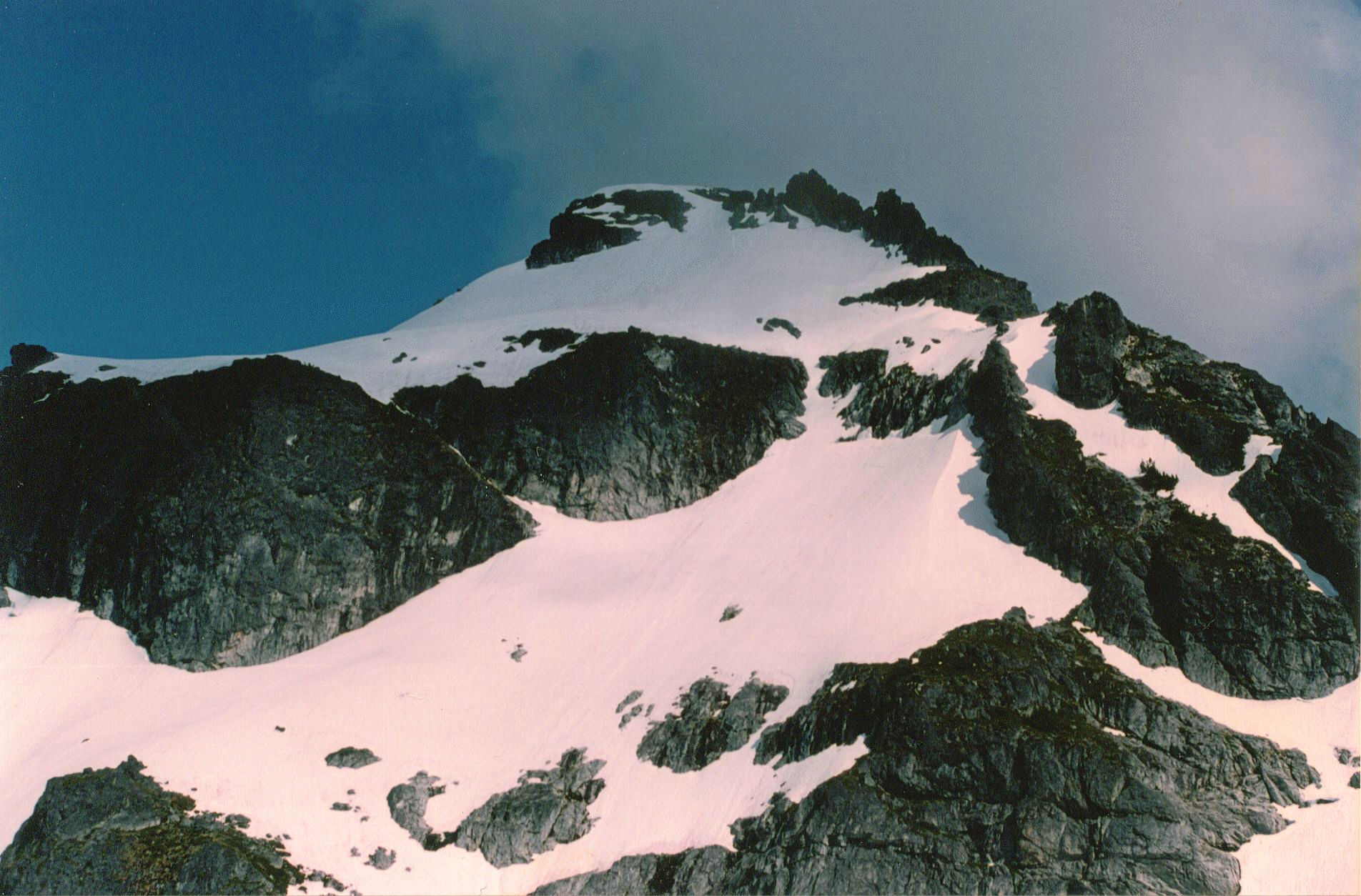
Approaching the summit of Pugh
