= Barlow Pass (Washington) =

Mountain pass

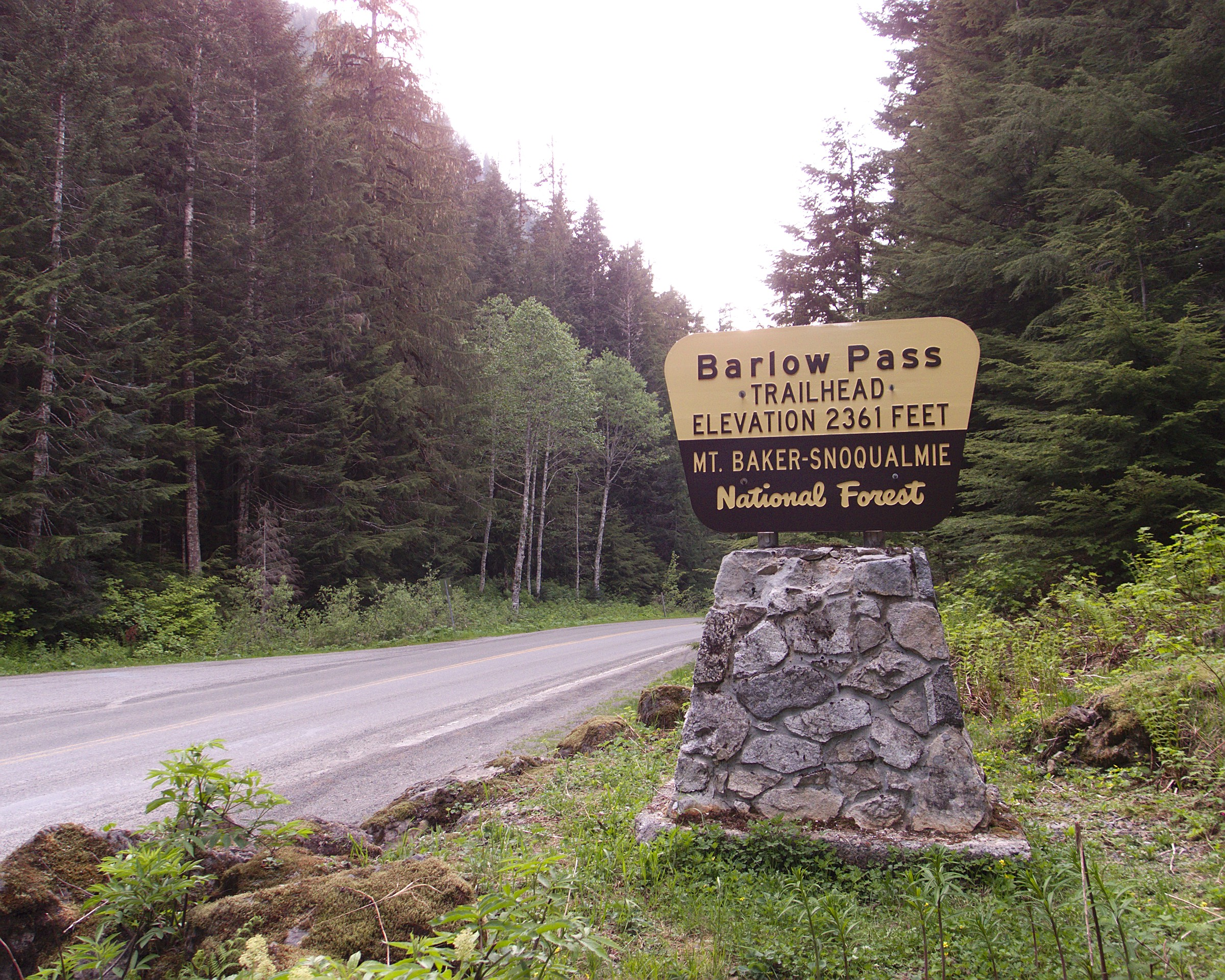
- Sign at Barlow Pass
- Interactive map of Barlow Pass
- Elevation: 2,362 ft (720 m)
- Traversed by: Mountain Loop Highway

Location
- Location: Snohomish County, Washington, United States
- Range: Cascades
- Coordinates: 48°1′35″N 121°26′38″W

Barlow Pass (elevation 2,362 feet (720 m)) is a mountain pass on the west side of the Cascades in Washington on the Mountain Loop Highway between Silverton and Darrington. It is a popular trail head for access to the old mining town of Monte Cristo and has a branch off to hike up to Gothic Basin, which is about a mile in.

The mining boom at Monte Cristo, starting in 1890, resulted in the need for access to the remote town. In 1891 a wagon road was built along the Sauk River, from the Skagit River to Monte Cristo. That same year it was discovered that Monte Cristo could be accessed via the South Fork Stillaguamish River. Railroad surveyor & engineer John Quincy Barlow (1861–1949) blazed a route from Silverton to Monte Cristo. Mining interests funded further work and soon a wagon road was built over Barlow Pass to join the Sauk wagon road. Later a railroad would be built over the same route.

It is the type locality of the mushroom species Cortinarius barlowensis.

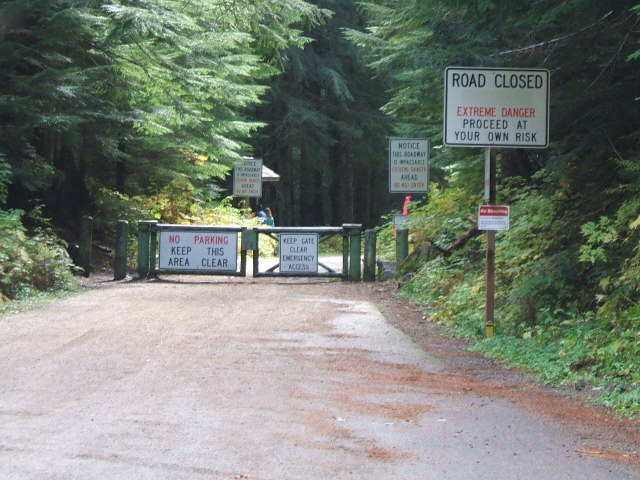
Monte Cristo trail head

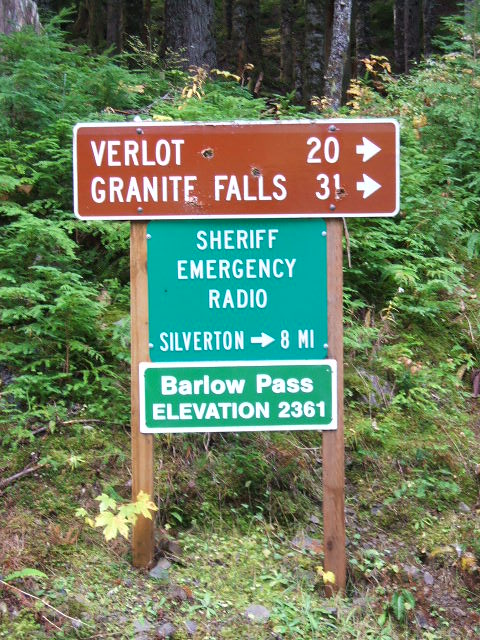
Road signage
