= Silvertip Peak =

Mountain in Washington (state), United States

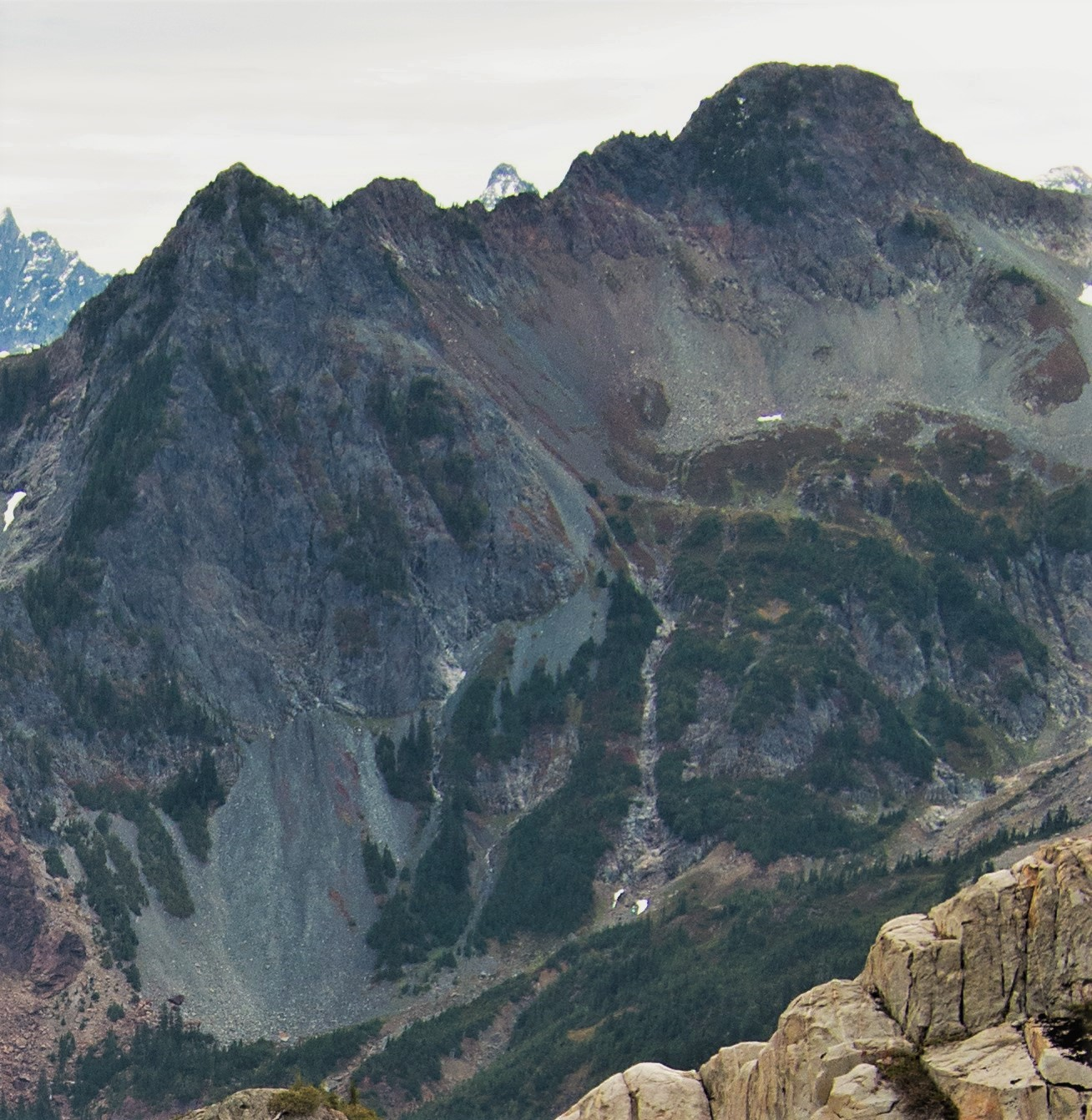
- Silvertip Peak, west aspect

Highest point
- Elevation: 6,140 ft (1,870 m)
- Prominence: 1,300 ft (400 m)
- Parent peak: Gothic Peak (6,213-ft)
- Isolation: 2.30 mi (3.70 km)
- Coordinates: 47°58′31″N 121°25′12″W

Geography
- Location within Washington (state) Location within the United States
- Interactive map of Silvertip Peak
- Country: United States
- State: Washington
- County: Snohomish
- Protected area: Henry M. Jackson Wilderness
- Parent range: Cascade Range
- Topo map: USGS Monte Cristo

Climbing
- Easiest route: class 3-4 scrambling south ridge

Silvertip Peak is a 6,140-foot (1,870-metre) mountain summit located in the North Cascades, in Snohomish County of Washington state. It is situated 3.5 miles south of Barlow Pass along the Mountain Loop Highway, in the Henry M. Jackson Wilderness, on land managed by Mount Baker-Snoqualmie National Forest. Precipitation runoff from the mountain drains north into tributaries of the Sauk River, or south into headwaters of Silver Creek which is a tributary of Skykomish River. Neighbors surrounding Silvertip include Gothic Peak, Del Campo Peak, Sheep Mountain, Cadet Peak, and Columbia Peak. Silver Lake and Poodle Dog Pass lie on the east flank of Silvertip, the Monte Cristo mining ghost town sits at the northeast base, and the Mineral City ghost town is at the southern foot of this peak. This peak was named in association with the nearby Silver Tip mining claim.

== Climate ==
Silvertip Peak is located in the marine west coast climate zone of western North America. Most weather fronts originating in the Pacific Ocean travel northeast toward the Cascade Mountains. As fronts approach the North Cascades, they are forced upward by the peaks of the Cascade Range (orographic lift), causing them to drop their moisture in the form of rain or snowfall onto the Cascades. As a result, the west side of the North Cascades experiences high precipitation, especially during the winter months in the form of snowfall. Because of maritime influence, snow tends to be wet and heavy, resulting in high avalanche danger. During winter months, weather is usually cloudy, but due to high pressure systems over the Pacific Ocean that intensify during summer months, there is often little or no cloud cover during the summer. Due to its temperate climate and proximity to the Pacific Ocean, areas west of the Cascade Crest very rarely experience temperatures below 0 °F (−18 °C) or above 80 °F (27 °C). The months July through September offer the most favorable weather for viewing or climbing this peak.

== Geology ==
The North Cascades features some of the most rugged topography in the Cascade Range with craggy peaks, ridges, and deep glacial valleys. Geological events occurring many years ago created the diverse topography and drastic elevation changes over the Cascade Range leading to the various climate differences. These climate differences lead to vegetation variety defining the ecoregions in this area.

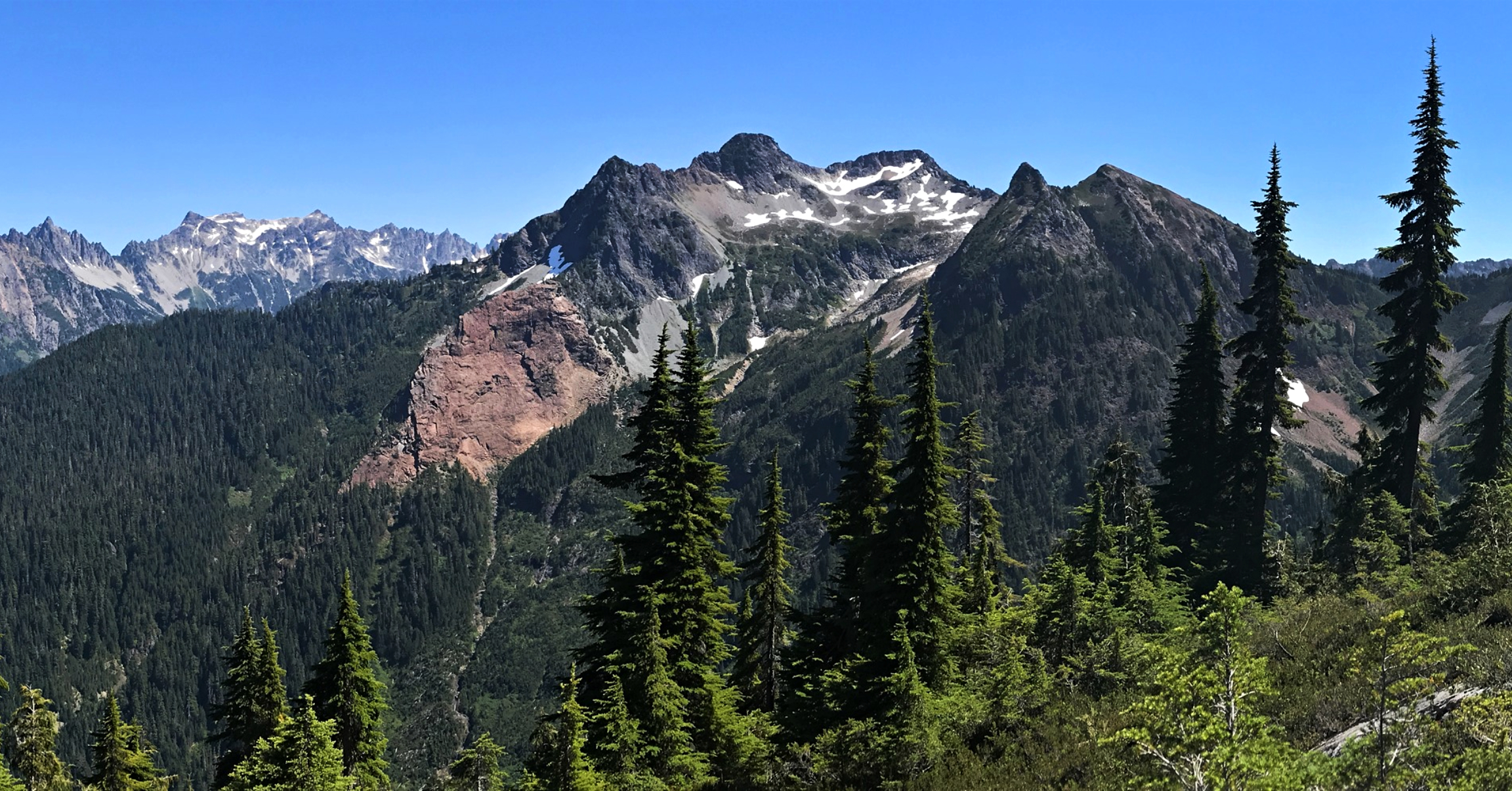
Silvertip Peak

The history of the formation of the Cascade Mountains dates back millions of years ago to the late Eocene Epoch. With the North American Plate overriding the Pacific Plate, episodes of volcanic igneous activity persisted. In addition, small fragments of the oceanic and continental lithosphere called terranes created the North Cascades about 50 million years ago.

During the Pleistocene period dating back over two million years ago, glaciation advancing and retreating repeatedly scoured the landscape leaving deposits of rock debris. The U-shaped cross section of the river valleys is a result of recent glaciation. Uplift and faulting in combination with glaciation have been the dominant processes which have created the tall peaks and deep valleys of the North Cascades area.

== Gallery ==
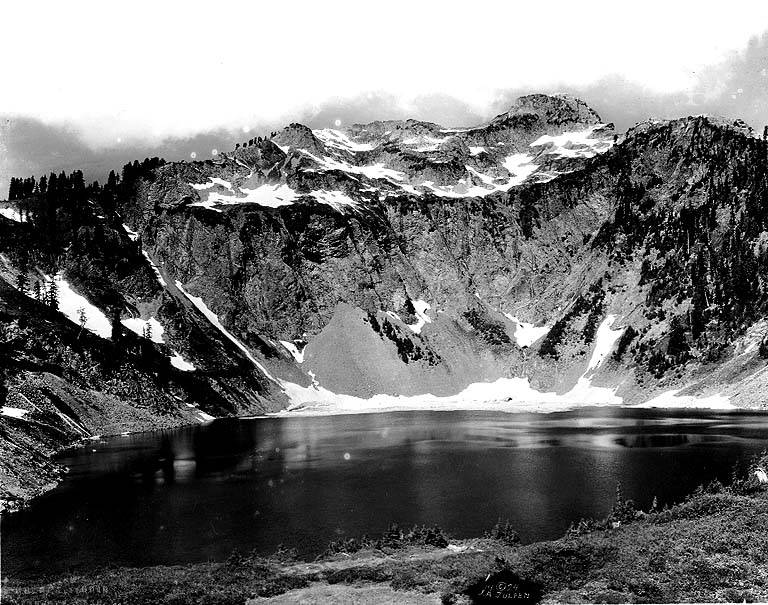
Silver Lake, Silvertip Peak, 1924

== See also ==
- Geography of the North Cascades
- Geology of the Pacific Northwest
- List of mountain peaks of Washington (state)
