= Foggy Lake =

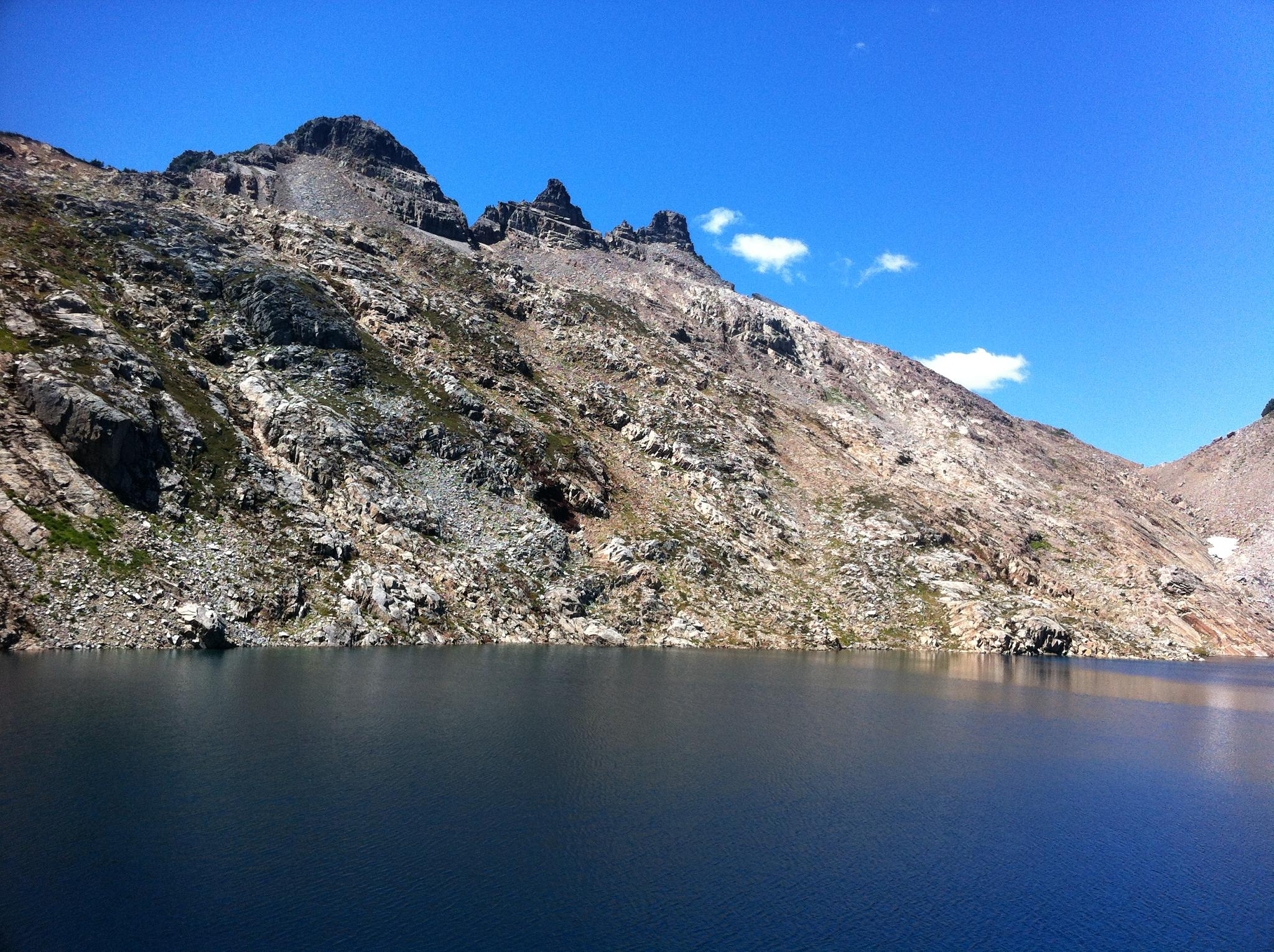
- Foggy Lake and Gothic Peak

- Location within Washington (state) Location within the United States
- Location: Snohomish County, Washington
- Coordinates: 47°59′2″N 121°28′2″W
- Lake type: Glacial lake
- Primary outflows: Weden Creek
- Basin countries: United States
- Average depth: 35 ft (11 m)
- Surface elevation: 5,223 ft (1,592 m)
- Islands: 0

Foggy Lake is a glacial lake located in Snohomish County, Washington and in the Mount Baker-Snoqualmie National Forest. The lake lies in Gothic Basin, below the east face of Gothic Peak and the south face of Del Campo Peak. The lake is a popular area for hiking, camping, and swimming.

== See also ==
- Gothic Basin
