= Morning Star Peak =

Mountain in Washington (state), United States

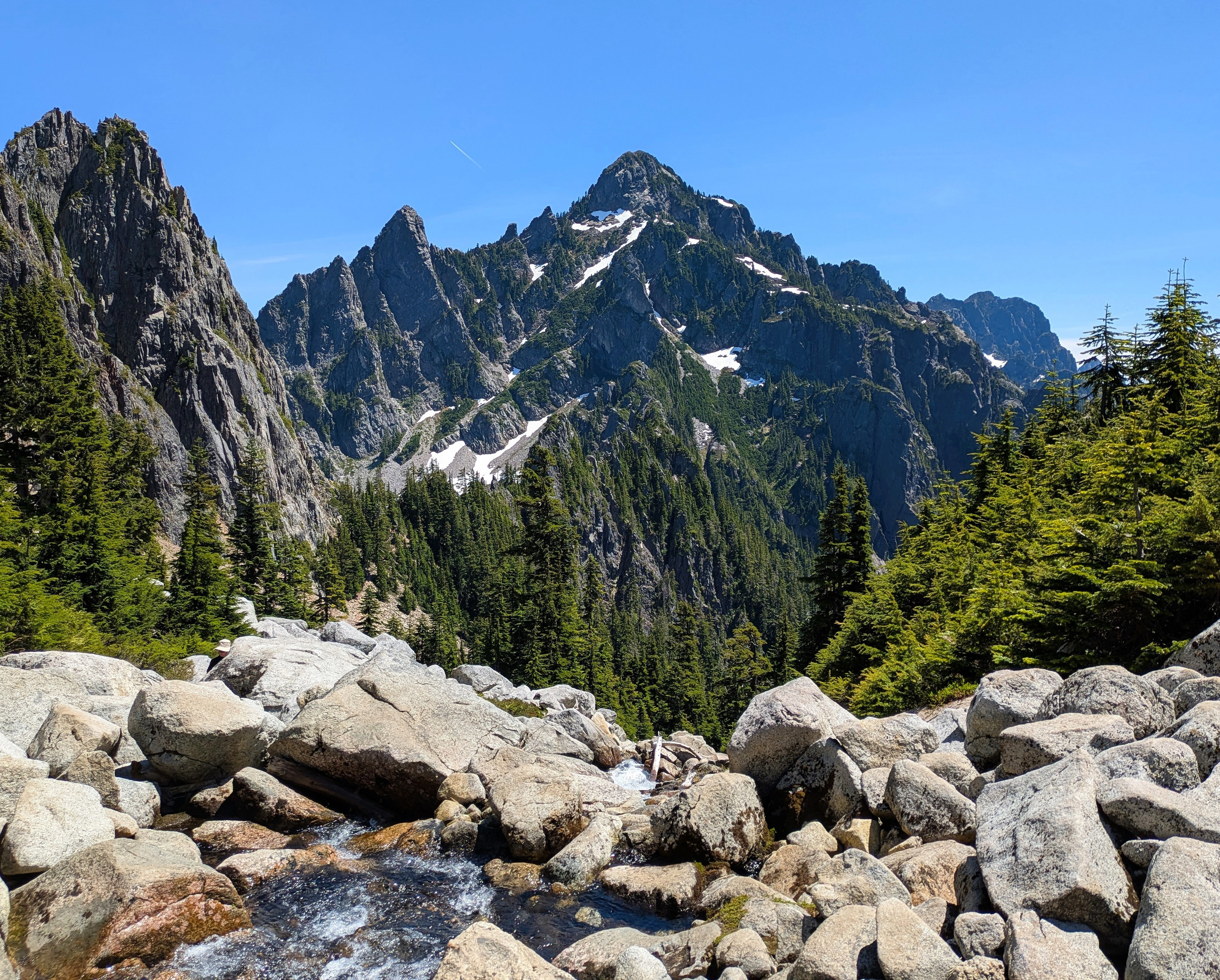
- North aspect, from near Vesper Lake

Highest point
- Elevation: 6,020 ft (1,835 m)
- Prominence: 980 ft (299 m)
- Parent peak: Del Campo Peak (6,610 ft)
- Isolation: 0.98 mi (1.58 km)
- Coordinates: 48°00′14″N 121°29′27″W

Geography
- Location within Washington (state) Location within the United States
- Interactive map of Morning Star Peak
- Country: United States
- State: Washington
- County: Snohomish
- Parent range: Cascade Range
- Topo map: USGS Bedal

Climbing
- First ascent: 1940 by Sam Heller
- Easiest route: class 3 scrambling

Morning Star Peak is a 6,020 ft (1,830 m) mountain summit located near the western edge of the North Cascades, in Snohomish County of Washington state. It is situated 2.5 mi (4.0 km) southwest of Barlow Pass along the Mountain Loop Highway near the Monte Cristo area. It is set on land managed by Mount Baker-Snoqualmie National Forest. The nearest higher neighbor is Sperry Peak, 1 mile (1.6 km) to the northwest. Precipitation runoff from the south side of the mountain drains into the Sultan River, and the north side drains into headwaters of the Stillaguamish River. July through September offer the most favorable weather for climbing this mountain.

== Climate ==
Morning Star Peak is located in the marine west coast climate zone of western North America. Most weather fronts originating in the Pacific Ocean travel northeast toward the Cascade Mountains. As fronts approach the North Cascades, they are forced upward by the peaks of the Cascade Range (orographic lift), causing them to drop their moisture in the form of rain or snowfall onto the Cascades. As a result, the west side of the North Cascades experiences high precipitation, especially during the winter months in the form of snowfall. Because of maritime influence, snow tends to be wet and heavy, resulting in high avalanche danger. During winter months, weather is usually cloudy, but due to high pressure systems over the Pacific Ocean that intensify during summer months, there is often little or no cloud cover during the summer. Due to its temperate climate and proximity to the Pacific Ocean, areas west of the Cascade Crest very rarely experience temperatures below 0 °F (−18 °C) or above 80 °F (27 °C).

== Geology ==
The North Cascades features some of the most rugged topography in the Cascade Range with craggy peaks, ridges, and deep glacial valleys. Geological events occurring many years ago created the diverse topography and drastic elevation changes over the Cascade Range leading to various climate differences. These climate differences lead to vegetation variety defining the ecoregions in this area.

The history of the formation of the Cascade Mountains dates back millions of years ago to the late Eocene Epoch. With the North American Plate overriding the Pacific Plate, episodes of volcanic igneous activity persisted. Glacier Peak, a stratovolcano that is 19 mi (31 km) east-northeast of Morning Star Peak, began forming in the mid-Pleistocene. In addition, small fragments of the oceanic and continental lithosphere called terranes created the North Cascades about 50 million years ago.

During the Pleistocene period dating back over two million years ago, glaciation advancing and retreating repeatedly scoured the landscape leaving deposits of rock debris. The U-shaped cross section of the river valleys is a result of recent glaciation. Uplift and faulting in combination with glaciation have been the dominant processes which have created the tall peaks and deep valleys of the North Cascades area.

== Gallery ==
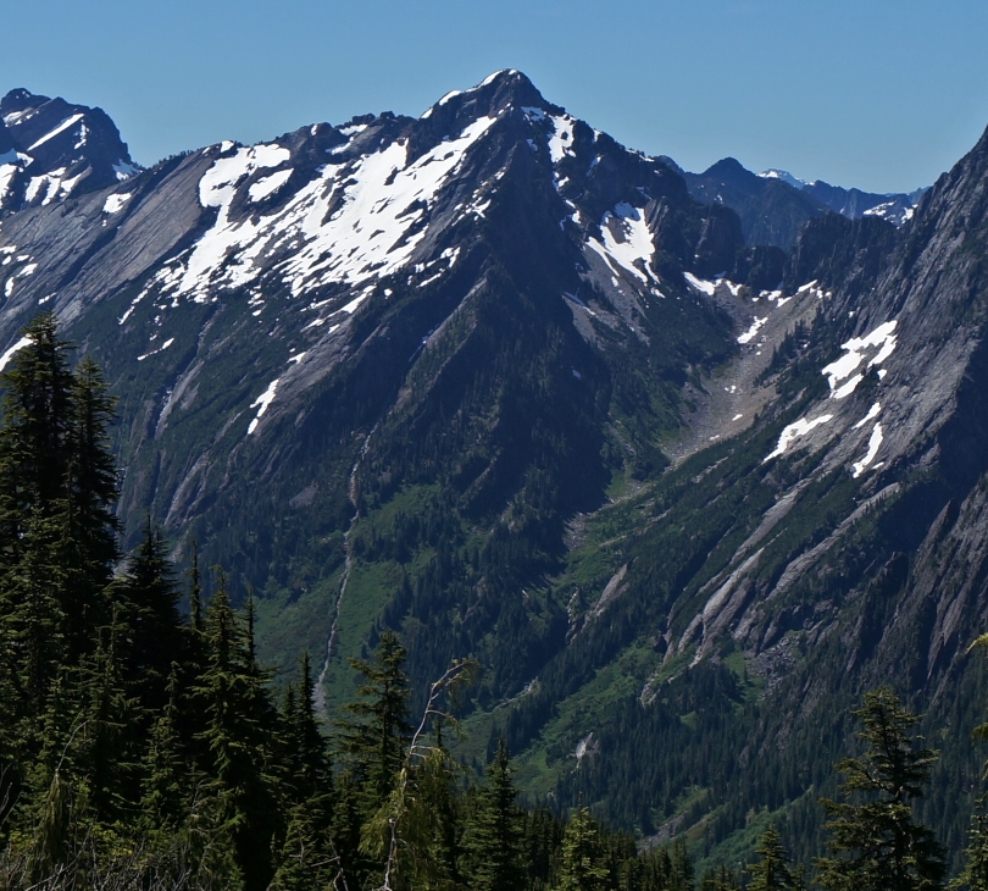
North aspect, from Dickerman

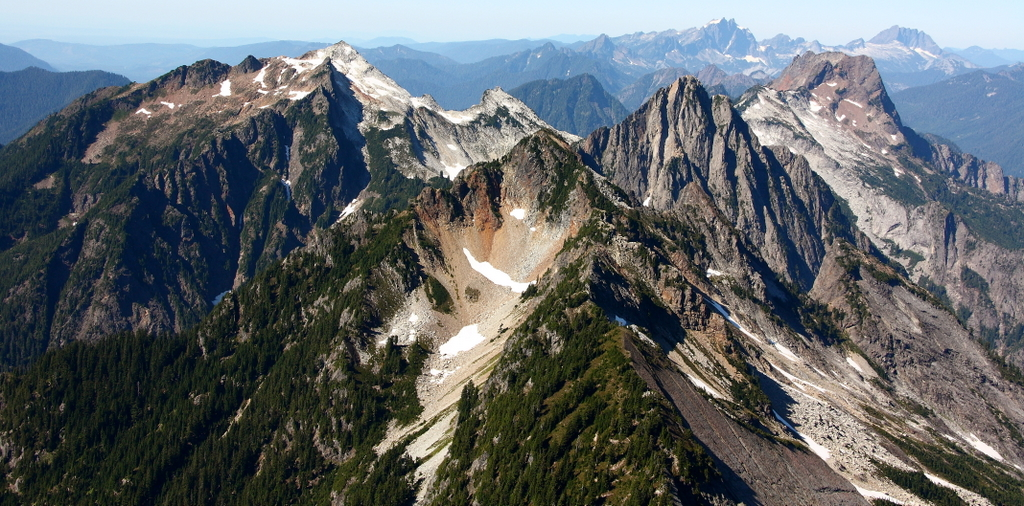
Morning Star front and center, from Del Campo Peak
(behind are Vesper, Sperry, and Big Four)

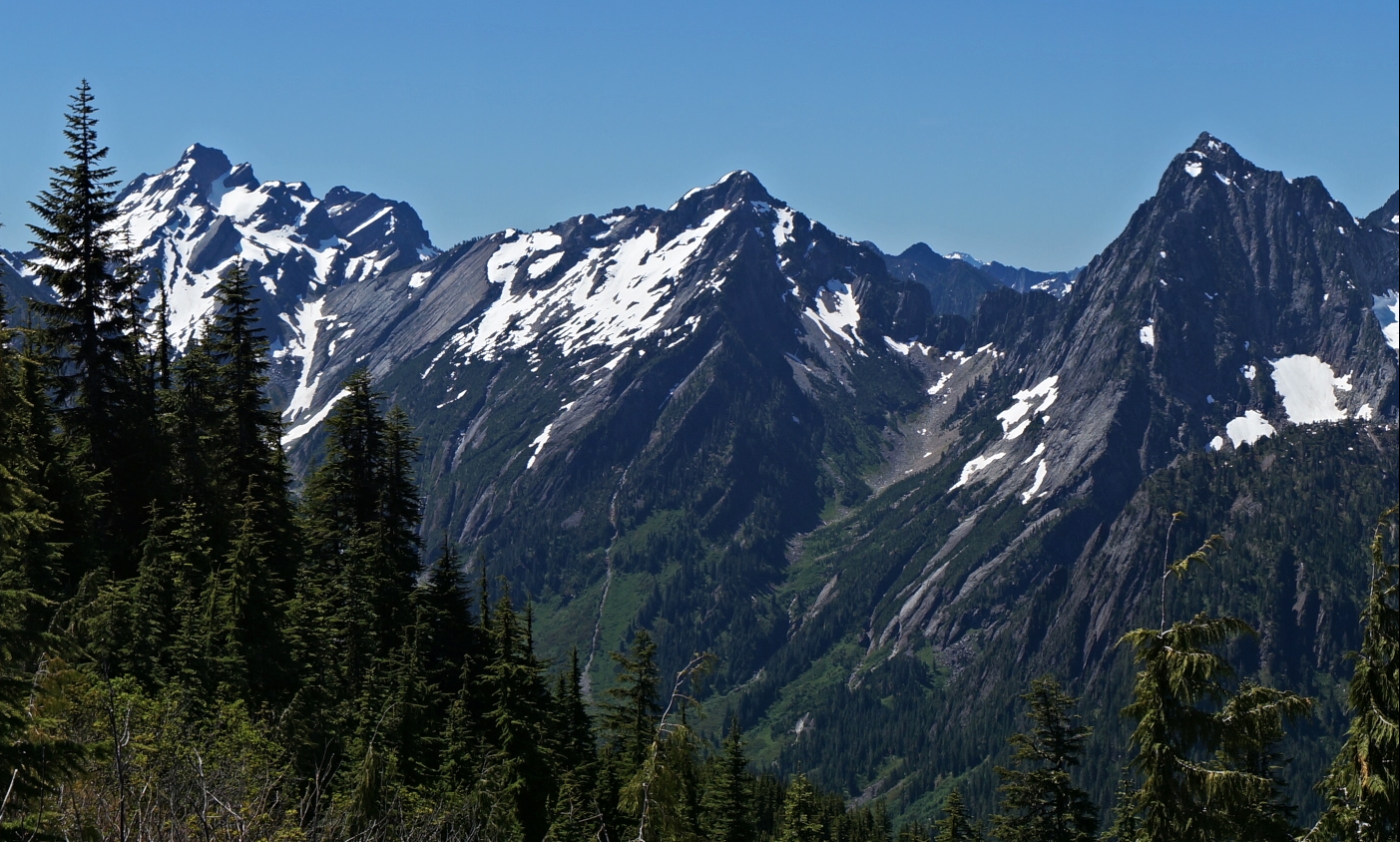
Del Campo, Morning Star, and Sperry

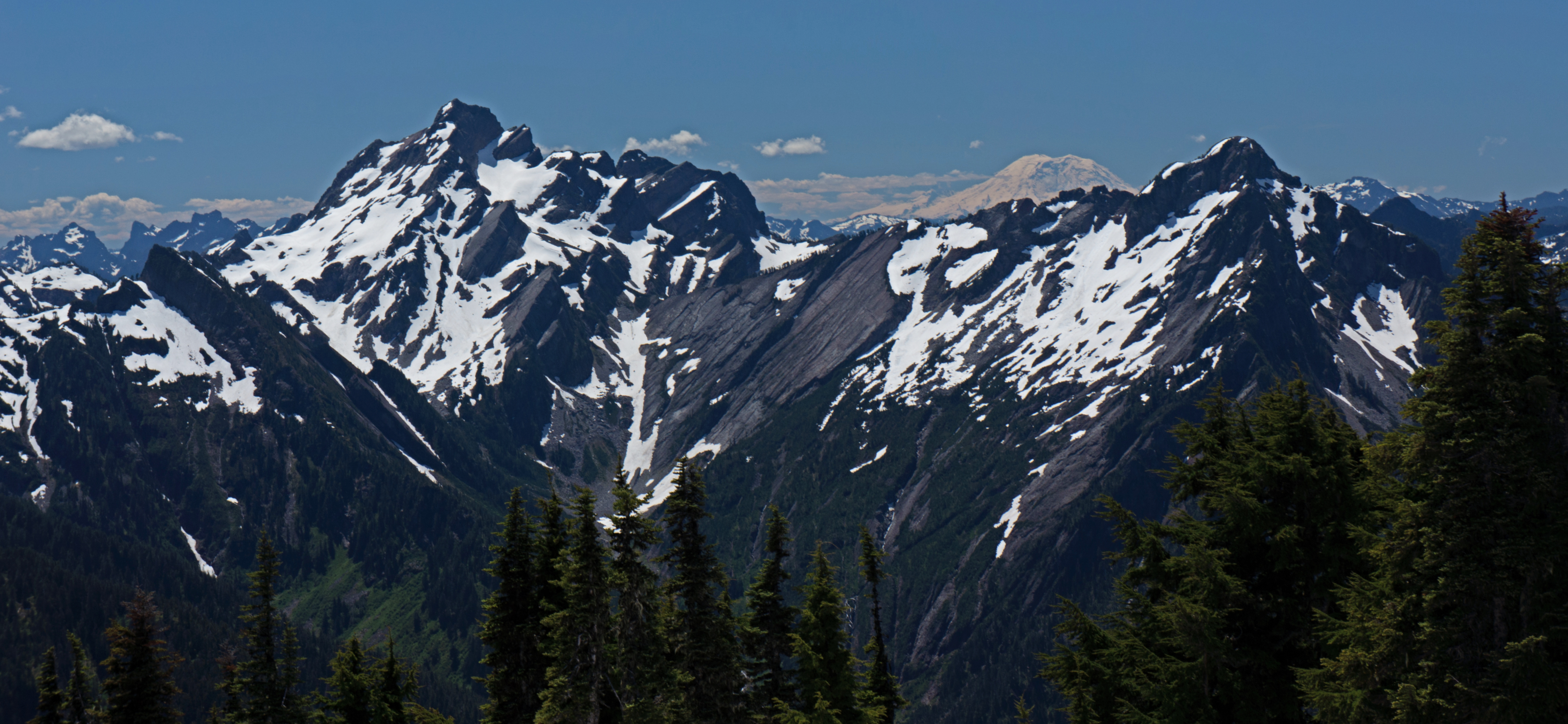
Del Campo and Morning Star

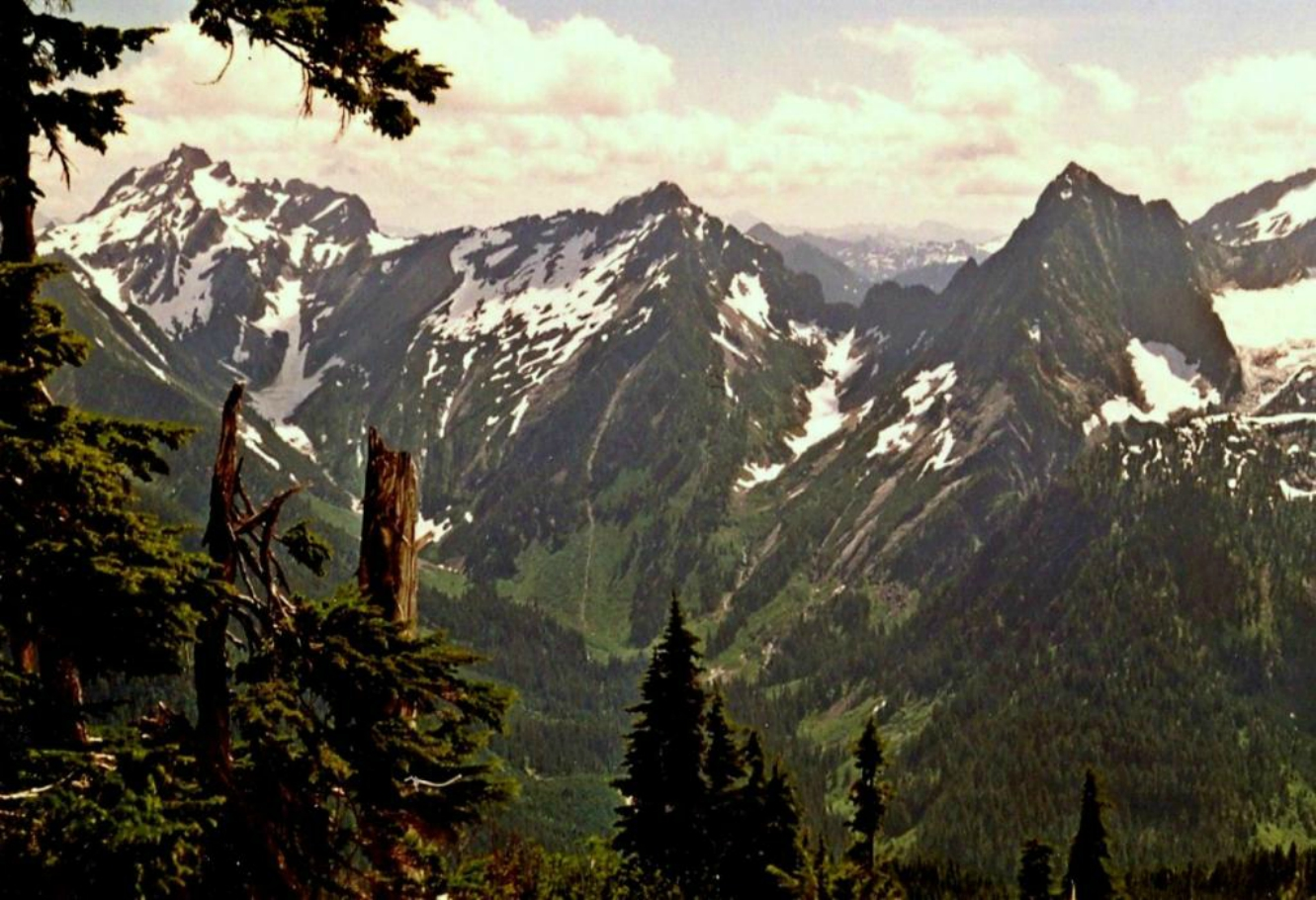
Morning Star centered

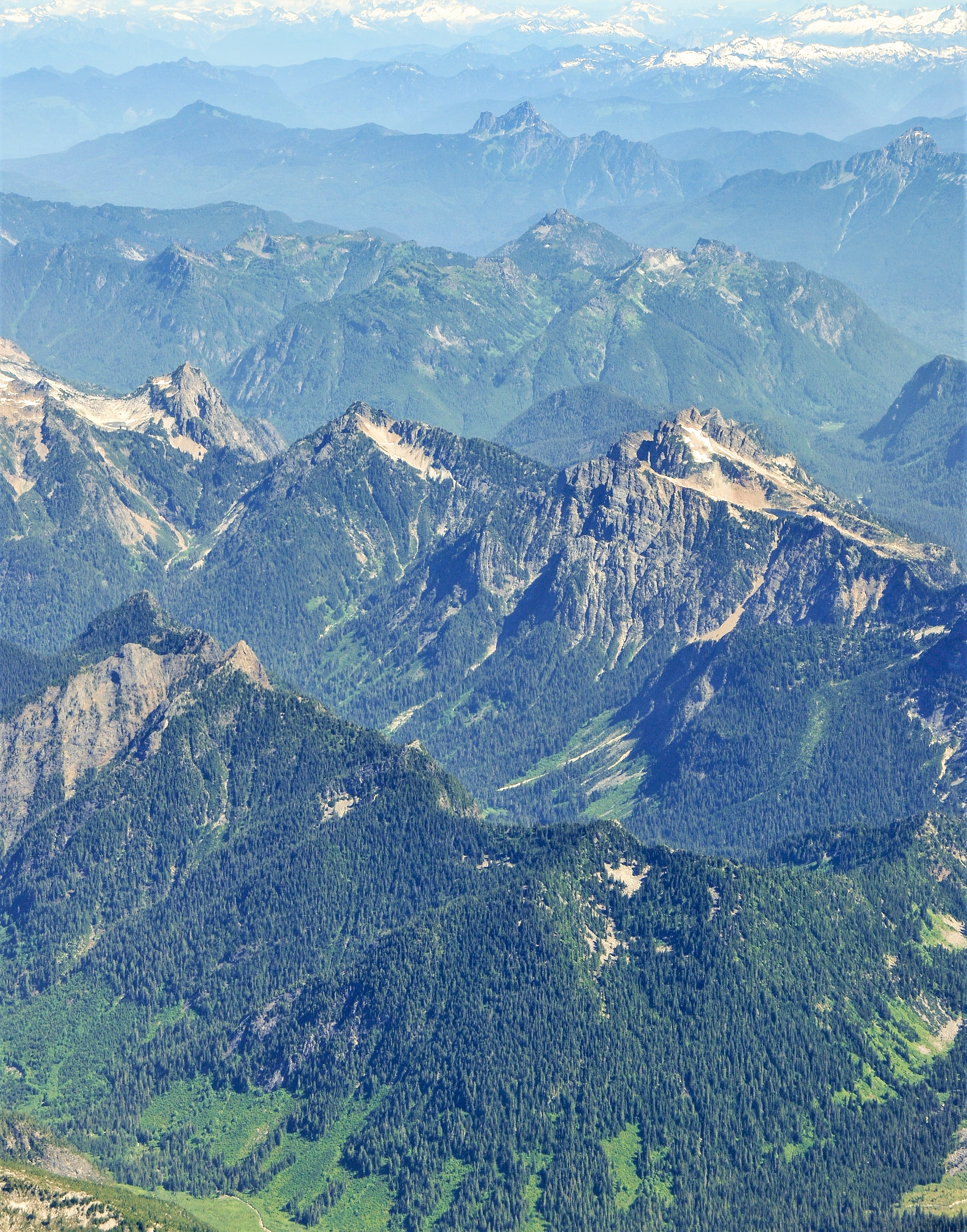
Aerial view, Morning Star left of center

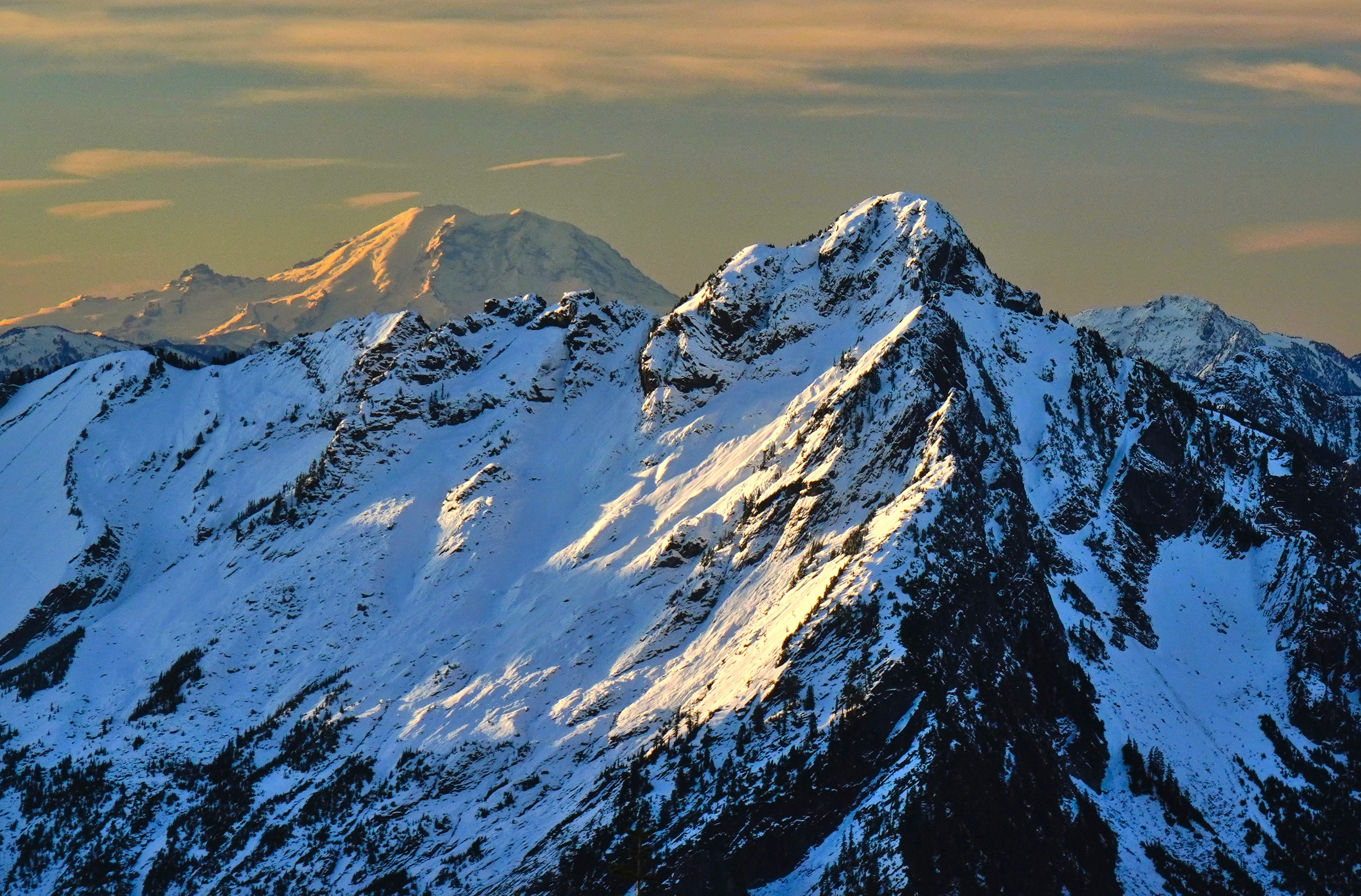
Morning Star Peak (right) and Mt. Rainier (left) viewed from Mt. Dickerman

== See also ==
- Geography of the North Cascades
- List of mountain peaks of Washington (state)
