= Sperry Peak =

Mountain in Washington (state), United States

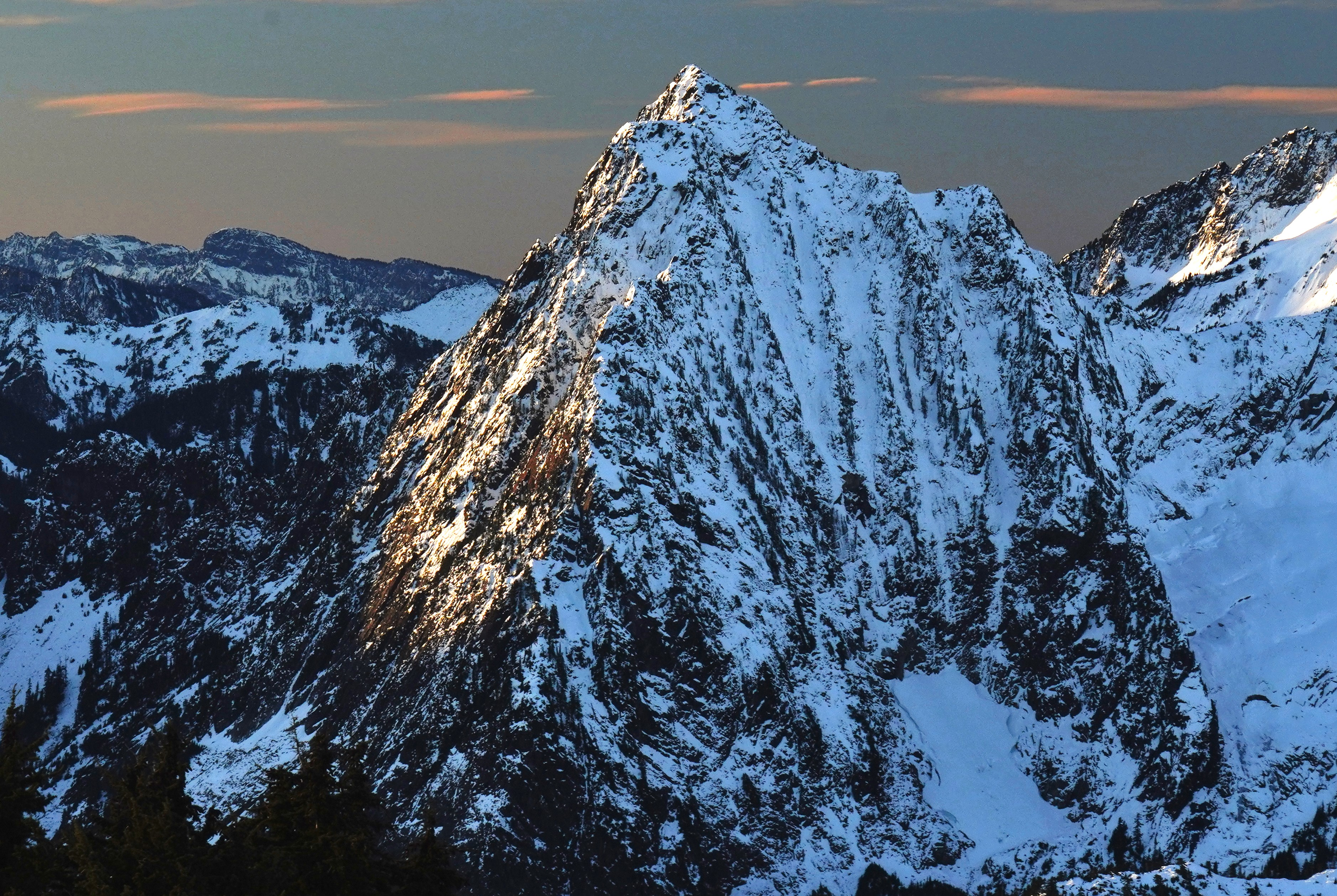
- North aspect of Sperry Peak

Highest point
- Elevation: 6,120 ft (1,865 m)
- Prominence: 720 ft (219 m)
- Parent peak: Vesper Peak
- Isolation: 0.73 mi (1.17 km)
- Coordinates: 48°00′57″N 121°30′09″W

Geography
- Location within Washington (state) Location within the United States
- Interactive map of Sperry Peak
- Country: United States
- State: Washington
- County: Snohomish
- Parent range: North Cascades; Cascade Range
- Topo map: USGS Silverton

Geology
- Rock age: 260 to 370 million years
- Rock type(s): metamorphosed sandstone shale, conglomerate

Climbing
- First ascent: 1927
- Easiest route: Scrambling Southwest slope

Sperry Peak is a 6,120+ ft (1,870+ m) mountain summit in Snohomish County of Washington state.

== Description ==
Sperry Peak is located 2.5 miles (4.0 km) east of Barlow Pass near the Mountain Loop Highway and the Monte Cristo area, on land managed by the Mount Baker-Snoqualmie National Forest. It is set in the South Fork Stillaguamish River Valley near the western edge of the North Cascades. The nearest higher neighbor is Vesper Peak, 0.74 miles (1.19 km) to the west, with a high connecting ridge between the two. Topographic relief is significant as the summit rises over 3,900 feet (1,189 meters) above the South Fork Stillaguamish in approximately one mile (1.6 km).

== History ==
The peak was named for A. D. (Dick) Sperry, a Silverton mining prospector during the 1890s. The Dick Sperry Picnic Area is near the historic site of the abandoned Sperry-Iverson mine near Silverton. The mountain's toponym has been officially adopted by the United States Board on Geographic Names. The first ascent of the summit was made in 1927 by Norval Grigg and Art Winder.

== Climate ==
Sperry Peak is located in the marine west coast climate zone of western North America. Most weather fronts originating in the Pacific Ocean travel northeast toward the Cascade Mountains. As fronts approach the North Cascades, they are forced upward by the peaks of the Cascade Range (orographic lift), causing them to drop their moisture in the form of rain or snowfall onto the Cascades. As a result, the west side of the North Cascades experiences high precipitation, especially during the winter months in the form of snowfall. Because of maritime influence, snow tends to be wet and heavy, resulting in high avalanche danger. During winter months, weather is usually cloudy, but due to high pressure systems over the Pacific Ocean that intensify during summer months, there is often little or no cloud cover during the summer. Due to its temperate climate and proximity to the Pacific Ocean, areas west of the Cascade Crest very rarely experience temperatures below 0 °F (−18 °C) or above 80 °F (27 °C). The months July through September offer the most favorable weather for viewing or climbing this peak.

== Geology ==
The North Cascades features some of the most rugged topography in the Cascade Range with craggy peaks, ridges, and deep glacial valleys. Geological events occurring many years ago created the diverse topography and drastic elevation changes over the Cascade Range leading to various climate differences.

The history of the formation of the Cascade Mountains dates back millions of years ago to the late Eocene Epoch. With the North American Plate overriding the Pacific Plate, episodes of volcanic igneous activity persisted. In addition, small fragments of the oceanic and continental lithosphere called terranes created the North Cascades about 50 million years ago.

During the Pleistocene period dating back over two million years ago, glaciation advancing and retreating repeatedly scoured the landscape leaving deposits of rock debris. The U-shaped cross section of the river valleys is a result of recent glaciation. Uplift and faulting in combination with glaciation have been the dominant processes which have created the tall peaks and deep valleys of the North Cascades area.

== Gallery ==
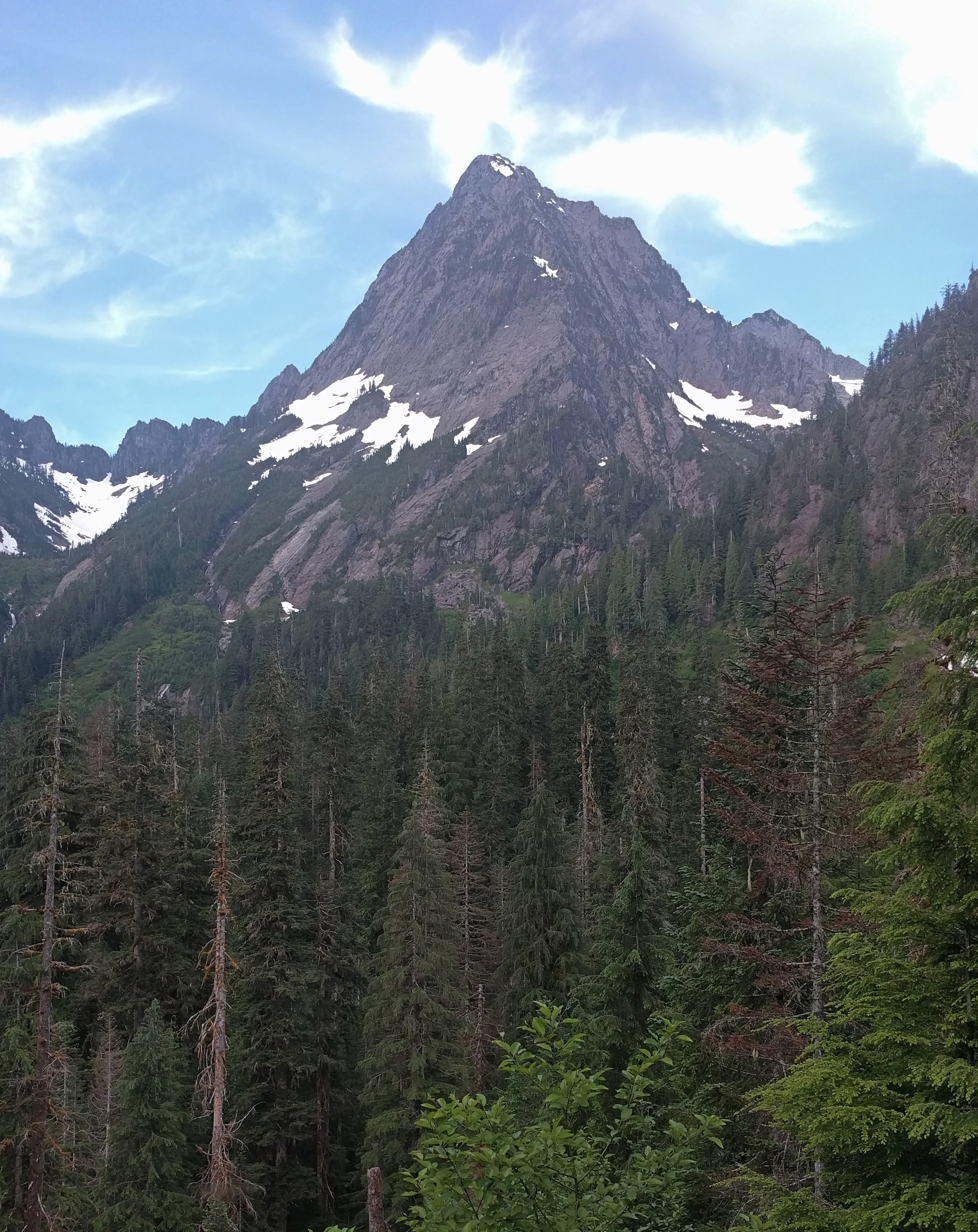
Sperry Peak

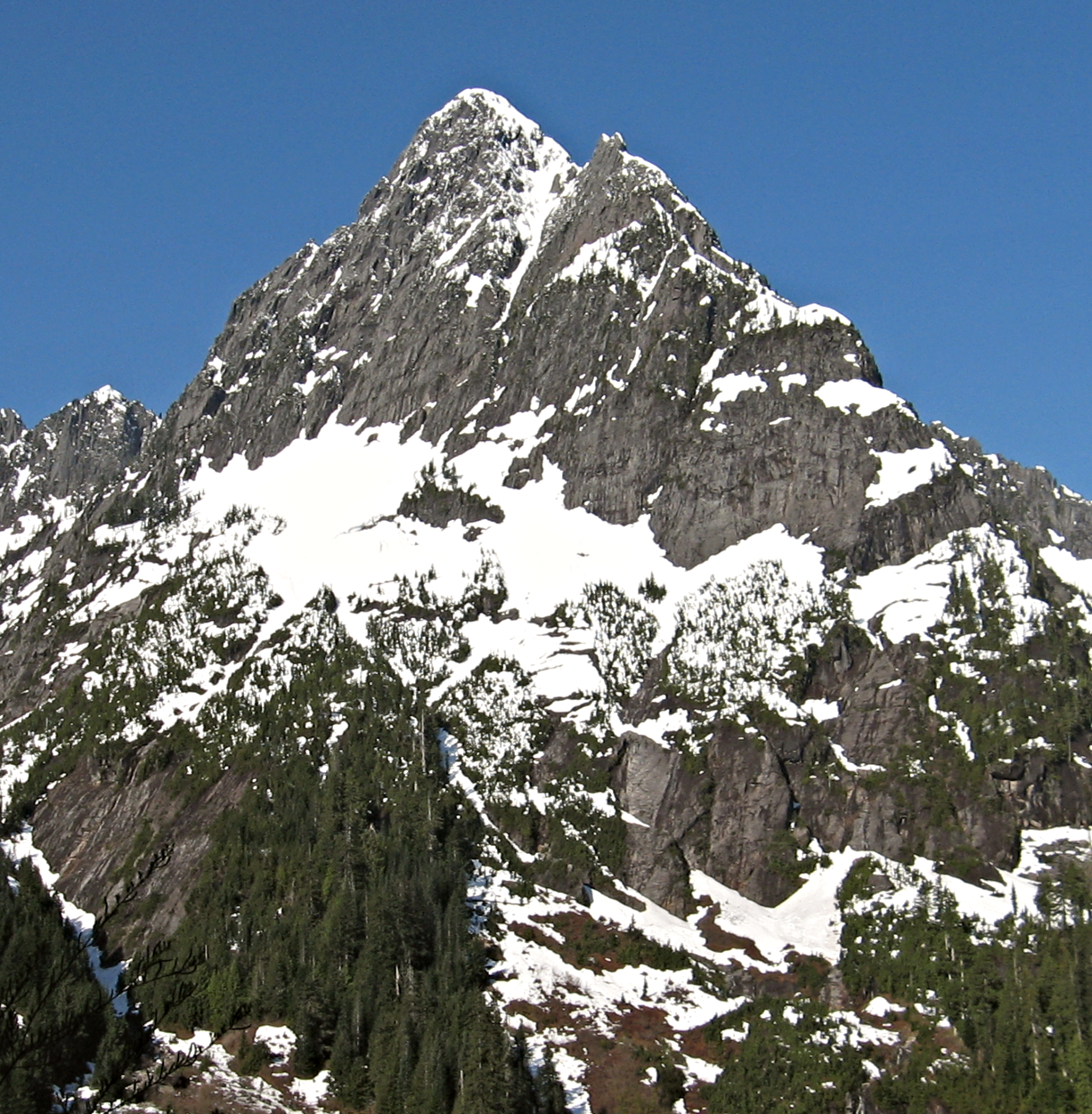
Sperry Peak seen from Sunrise Mine Road

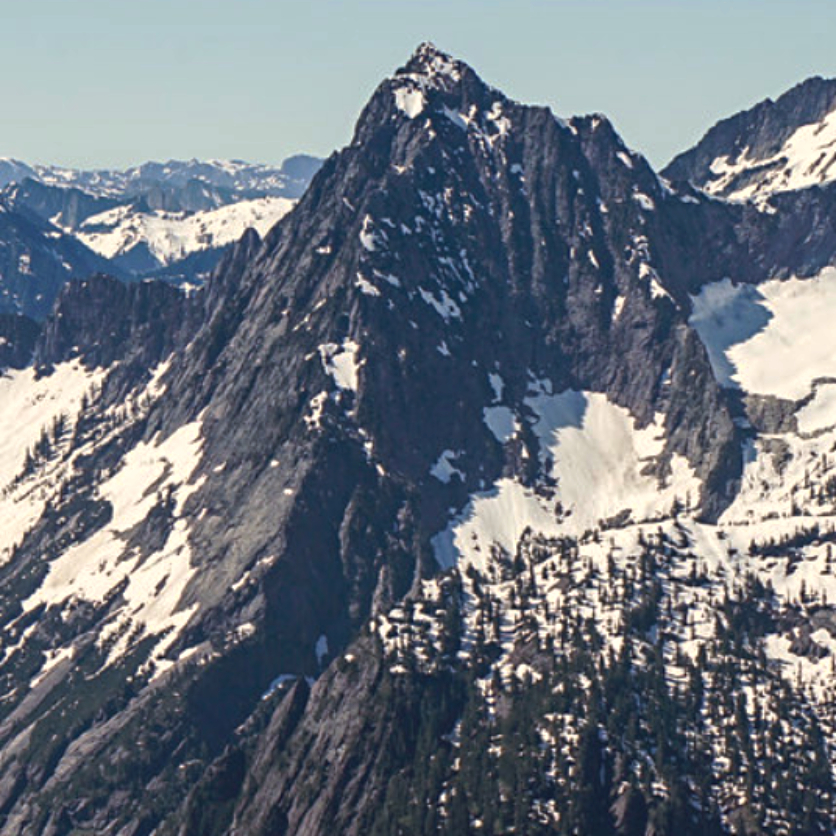
Sperry Peak, north face

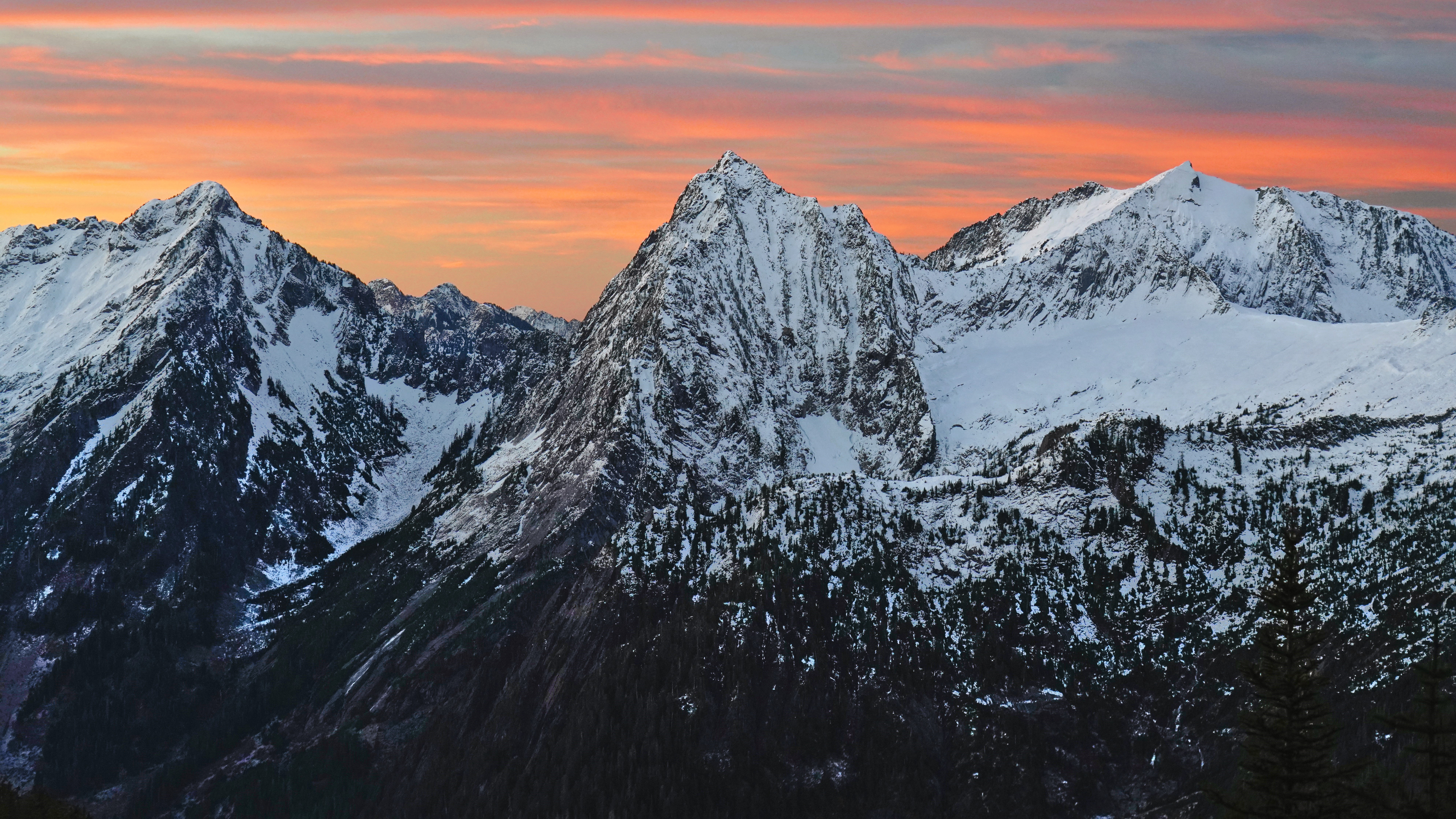
Morning Star Peak (left), Sperry Peak (center), Vesper Peak (right) viewed from Dickerman Mountain before sunrise

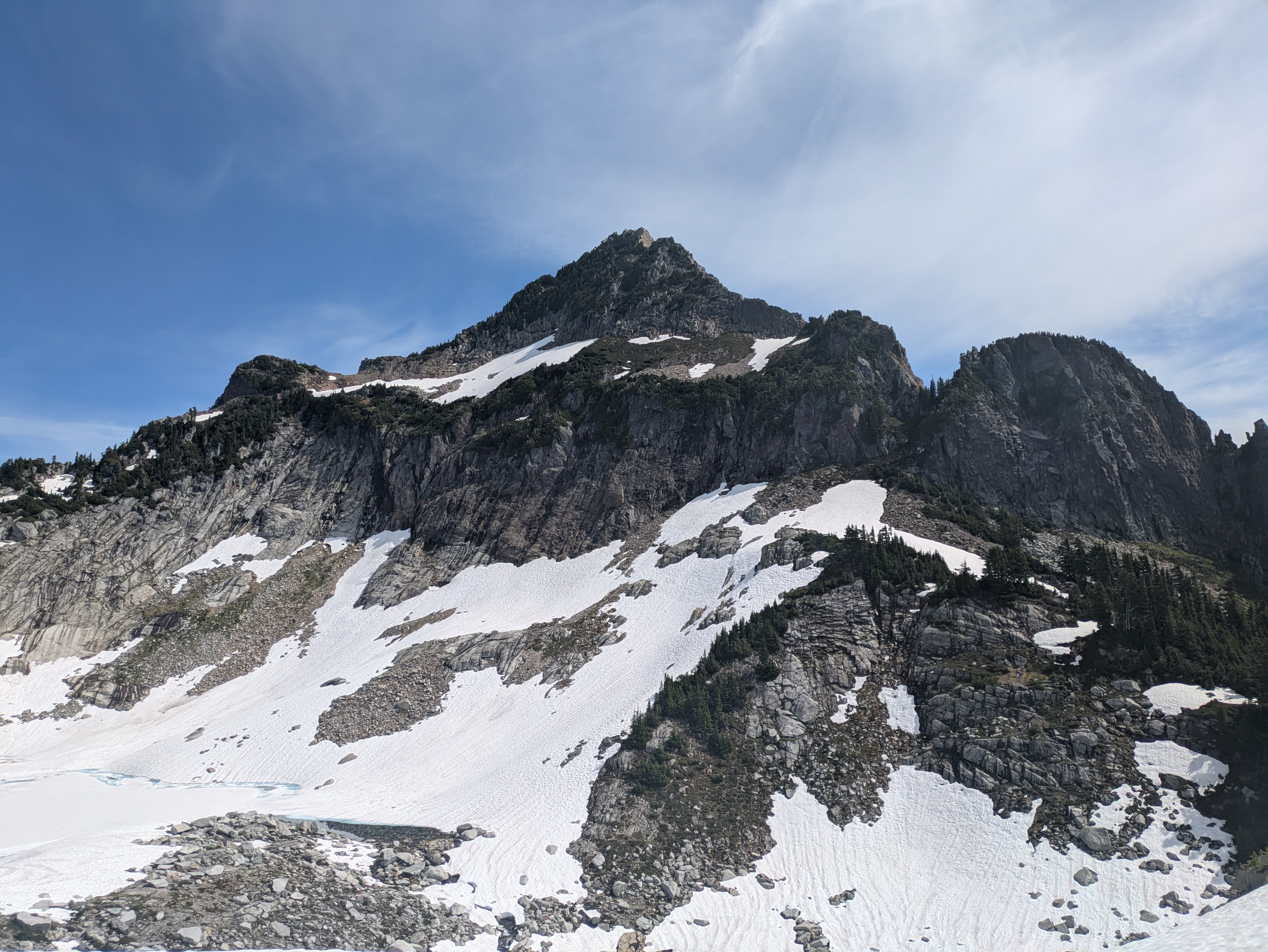
West aspect

== See also ==
- Geography of Washington (state)
- Geology of the Pacific Northwest
