= Mount Dickerman =

Mountain in Washington (state), United States

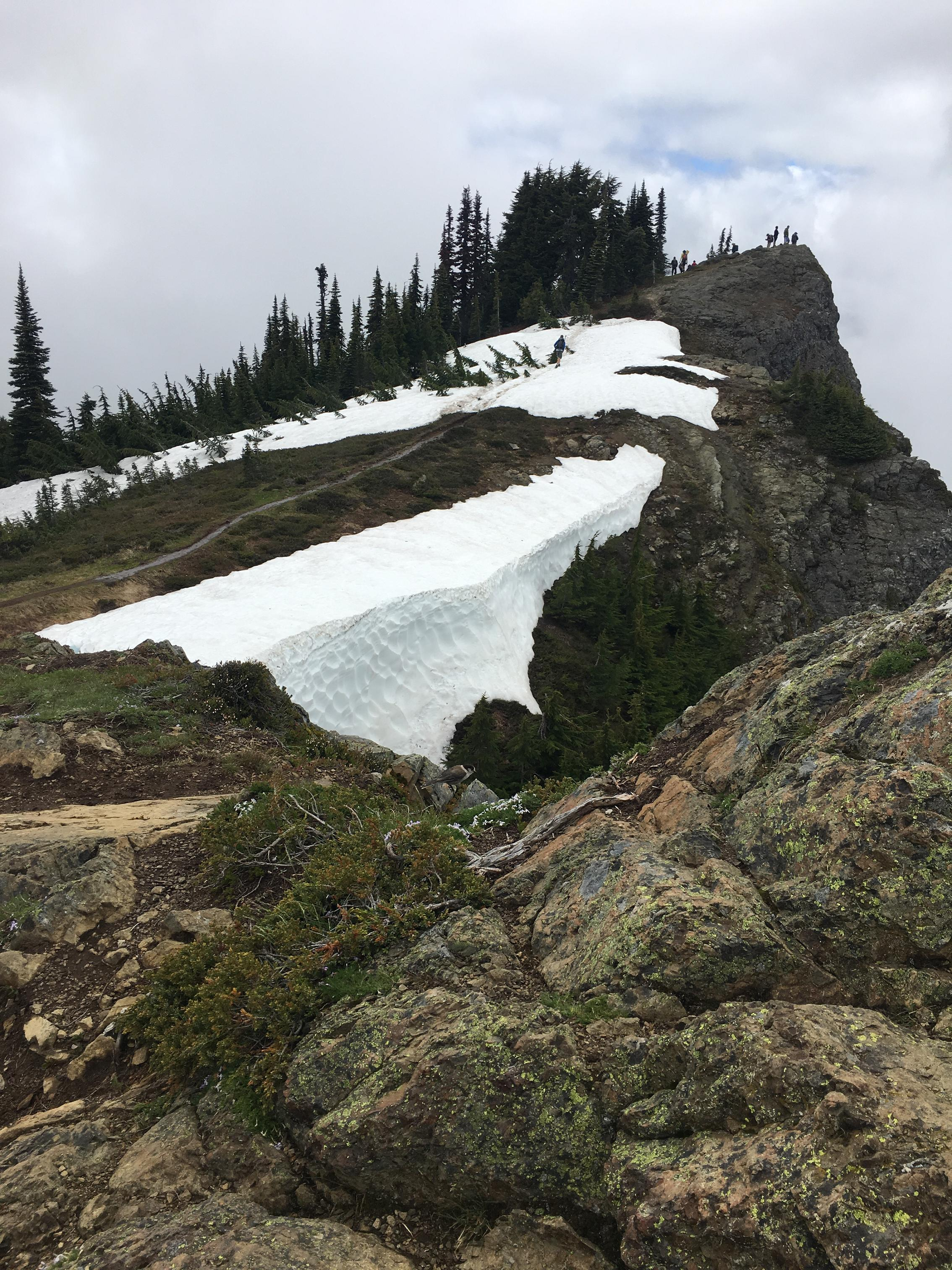
- View of Mount Dickerman Summit on a cloudy day.

Highest point
- Elevation: 5,728 ft (1,746 m)
- Prominence: 803 ft (245 m)
- Coordinates: 48°04′07″N 121°28′13″W

Geography
- Location within Washington (state)
- Country: United States of America
- State: Washington
- County: Snohomish County
- Parent range: Cascade Range
- Topo map: USGS Bedal

Climbing
- Easiest route: Hiking trail

Mount Dickerman, or Dickerman Mountain, is a mountain in Mount Baker-Snoqualmie National Forest in Washington state. It is located northwest of Barlow Pass along the Mountain Loop Highway. A strenuous four mile trail leads from this highway to the summit with views which includes Glacier Peak, Monte Cristo Peak, and Sloan Peak.

The mountain was named after Alton Leslie Dickerman Sr (1850–1921), the consulting geologist for the Monte Cristo Mining Company.

== Climate ==
Dickerman is located in the marine west coast climate zone of western North America. Most weather fronts originate in the Pacific Ocean, and travel northeast toward the Cascade Mountains. As fronts approach the North Cascades, they are forced upward by the peaks of the Cascade Range, causing them to drop their moisture in the form of rain or snowfall onto the Cascades (Orographic lift). As a result, the west side of the North Cascades experiences high precipitation, especially during the winter months in the form of snowfall. Due to its temperate climate and proximity to the Pacific Ocean, areas west of the Cascade Crest very rarely experience temperatures below 0 °F (−18 °C) or above 80 °F (27 °C). During winter months, weather is usually cloudy, but, due to high pressure systems over the Pacific Ocean that intensify during summer months, there is often little or no cloud cover during the summer. Because of maritime influence, snow tends to be wet and heavy, resulting in high avalanche danger.

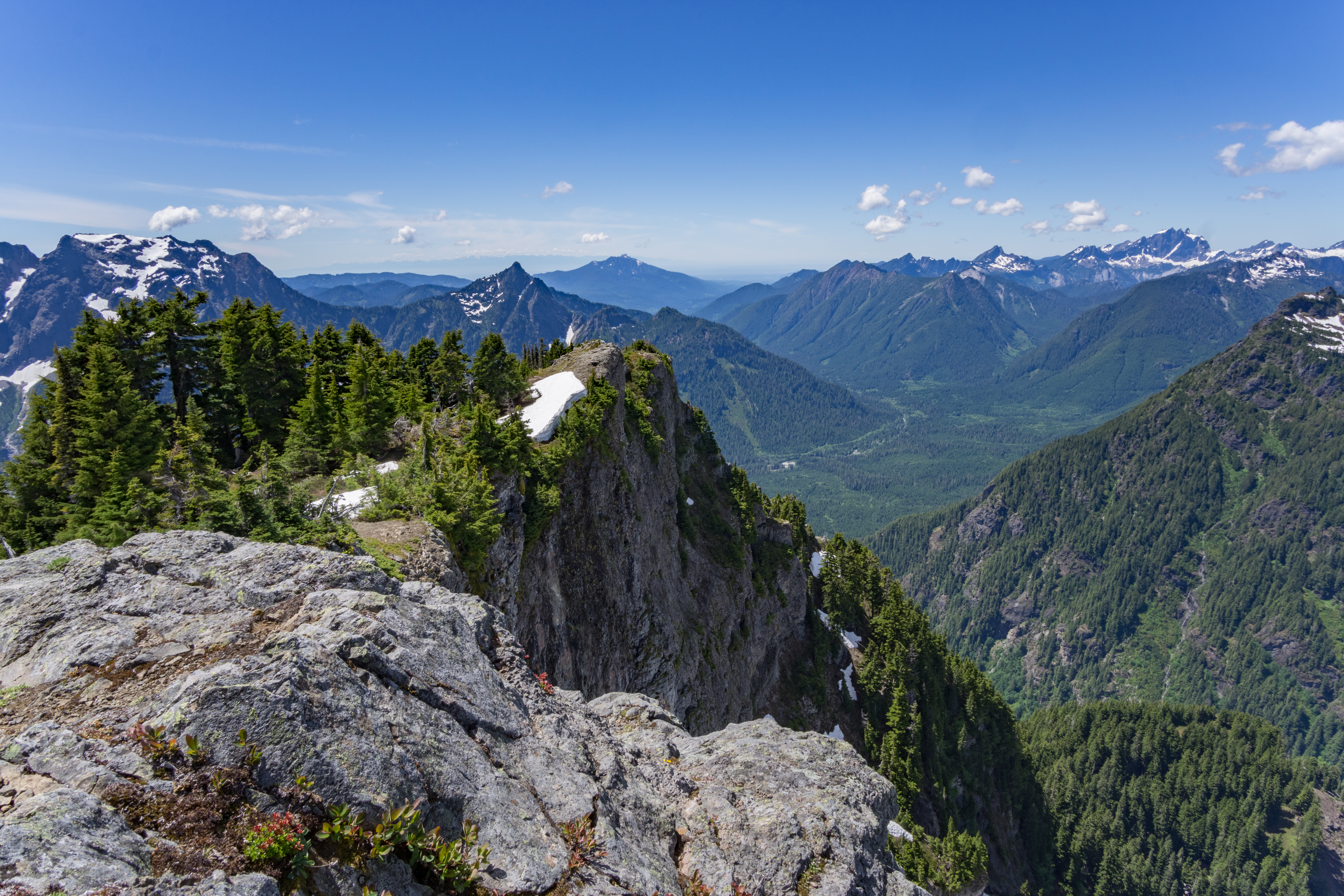
View from Dickerman's summit

== See also ==
- Geography of the North Cascades
- Mountain peaks of the United States
