= Vesper Peak =

Mountain in Washington (state), United States

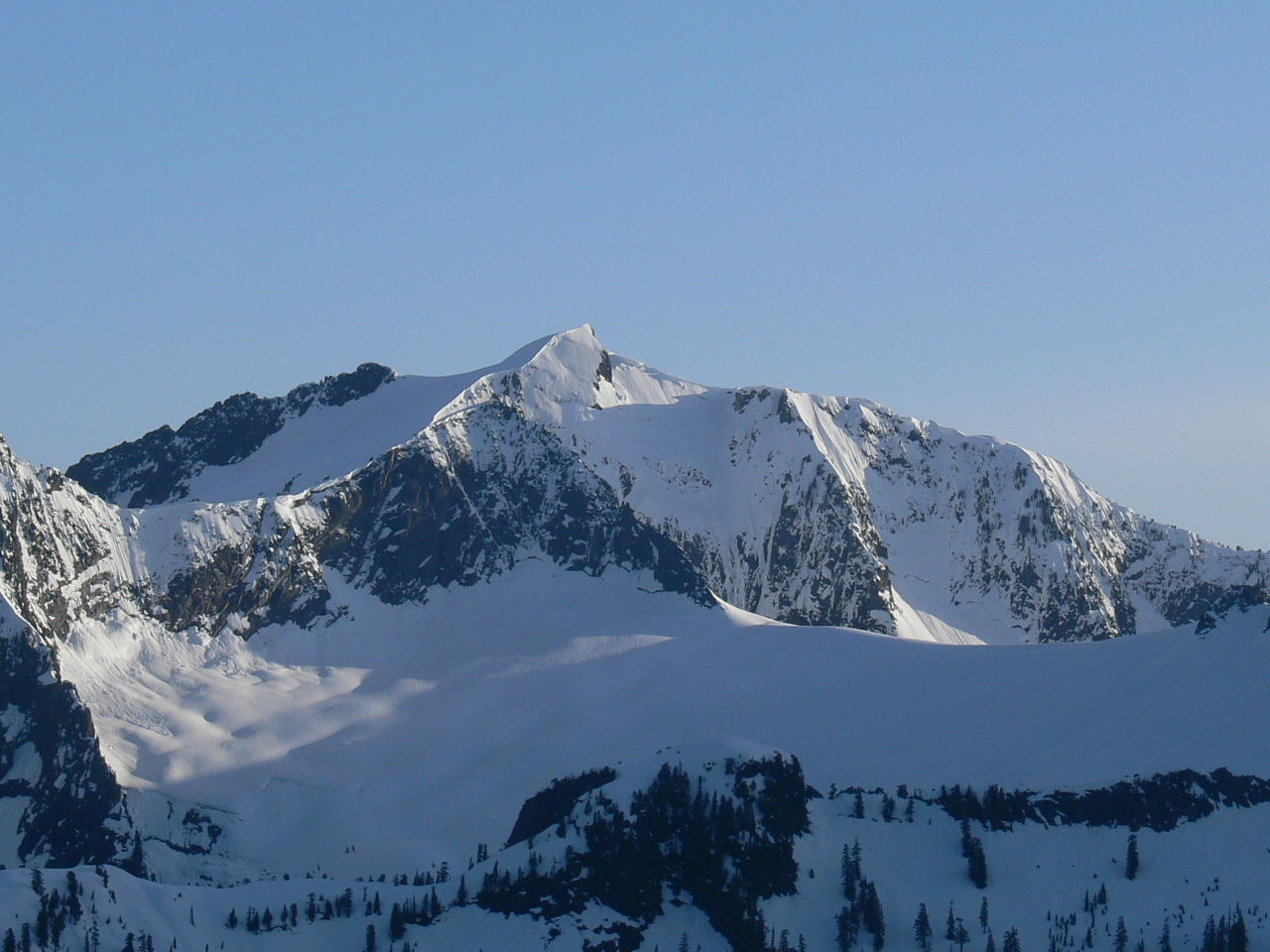
- Photo of Vesper Peak from Mount Dickerman

Highest point
- Elevation: 6,221 ft (1,896 m)
- Prominence: 1,574 ft (480 m)
- Coordinates: 48°00′47″N 121°31′04″W

Geography
- Location: Snohomish County, Washington, U.S.
- Parent range: North Cascades, Cascade Range
- Topo map: USGS Silverton

Climbing
- First ascent: Before 1918, possibly by Louis C. Fletcher et al. (surveyors)
- Easiest route: East Ridge: moderate scramble, (class 2)

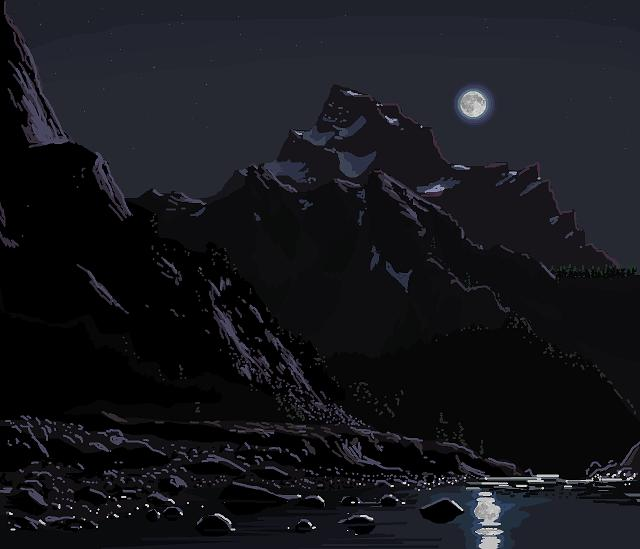
Del Campo Peak from Vesper Lake

Vesper Peak is a peak along the Mountain Loop Highway region of the North Cascades of Washington state. It is about 18 miles (29 km) south of Darrington and 21 miles (34 km) east of Granite Falls, in the Mount Baker-Snoqualmie National Forest. Its gentle south and east slopes contrast with a sheer north face which offers "excellent technical routes".

== Geology ==
Vesper Peak consists of biotite-quartz diorite that intrudes metamorphosed Mesozoic ribbon cherts. The ribbon chert underlies its south and southwest slopes. This Oligocene biotite-quartz diorite stock is an offshoot and extension of the Index batholith that outcrops south of this peak.

=== Historic Mining ===
Vesper Peak lies in the eastern part of the Sultan Mining District. Directly associated with Vesper Peak are the now-depleted Vesper Peak Garnet Deposit, also known as the 48-58 Prospect, which lies near it summit and the Sunrise Copper Prospect, which lies near its base. Grossular garnets and other gem quality minerals were mined from a lens of fine- to coarse-grained skarn composed of hedenbergite, grossular, quartz, and wollastonite. The pod formed from the hydrothermal alteration of limestone that was completely enclosed in chert near the chert-diorite contact. This lens was about 30 m (98 ft) long, 20 m (66 ft) wide, and at it thickest about 120 m (390 ft) thick. The Sunrise Copper Prospect lies less than a 1 km (0.62 mi) southeast of Vesper Peak at altitudes of about 1,200 to 1,500 m (3,900 to 4,900 ft) in rough and precipitous terrain. It consists of a large mass of quartz-cemented tectonic breccia which contains chalcopyrite and molybdenite as the primary ore minerals. In 1976, an unsuccessful proposal was made to develop the Sunrise Copper Prospect as a major molybdenum mine on Vesper Peak.

The maps of Broughton, Carithers, and others, show the presence of additional open cut pits and underground workings from historic mineral exploration in the immediate vicinity of Vesper Peak. For example, numerous copper prospects, including underground mine workings, can be found about 5 to 6.5 km (3.1 to 4.0 mi) north and northwest of Vesper Peak between Copper Lake and Marble Pass. In addition, about 2 km (1.2 mi) west and southwest of Vesper Peak, lie additional mineral prospects, e.g., Ala-Dickson and Mountain Cedar prospects, containing open cut pits, audits, and shafts. Other unmapped and unrecorded, mine works may exist in the area of Vesper Peak.

== Climbing and recreation ==
The peak was ascended in 1918 during a Mountaineers outing, but "they were likely preceded by prospectors and a geological survey party led by Louis C. Fletcher". The steep north face was first climbed in 1968 by Bruce Garrett and Jim Langdon; several routes exist on the face, with difficulties in the 5.6 to 5.10 range.

The summit can be reached from the Sunrise Mine Road (No. 4065), off the Mountain Loop Highway. The hike is a 10-mile (16 km) round trip with an elevation gain of 4,114 feet (1,254 m). The summit affords views of Glacier Peak, Sloan Peak, Mount Dickerman, Mount Pugh, Mount Rainier, Mount Stuart and a bit of the top of Mount Adams.

== In popular culture ==
This Location is the first scene the player sees, and an optional destination in the "Postcards" section in the VR Demo The Lab.
