= Gothic Peak (Washington) =

Mountain in Washington (state), United States

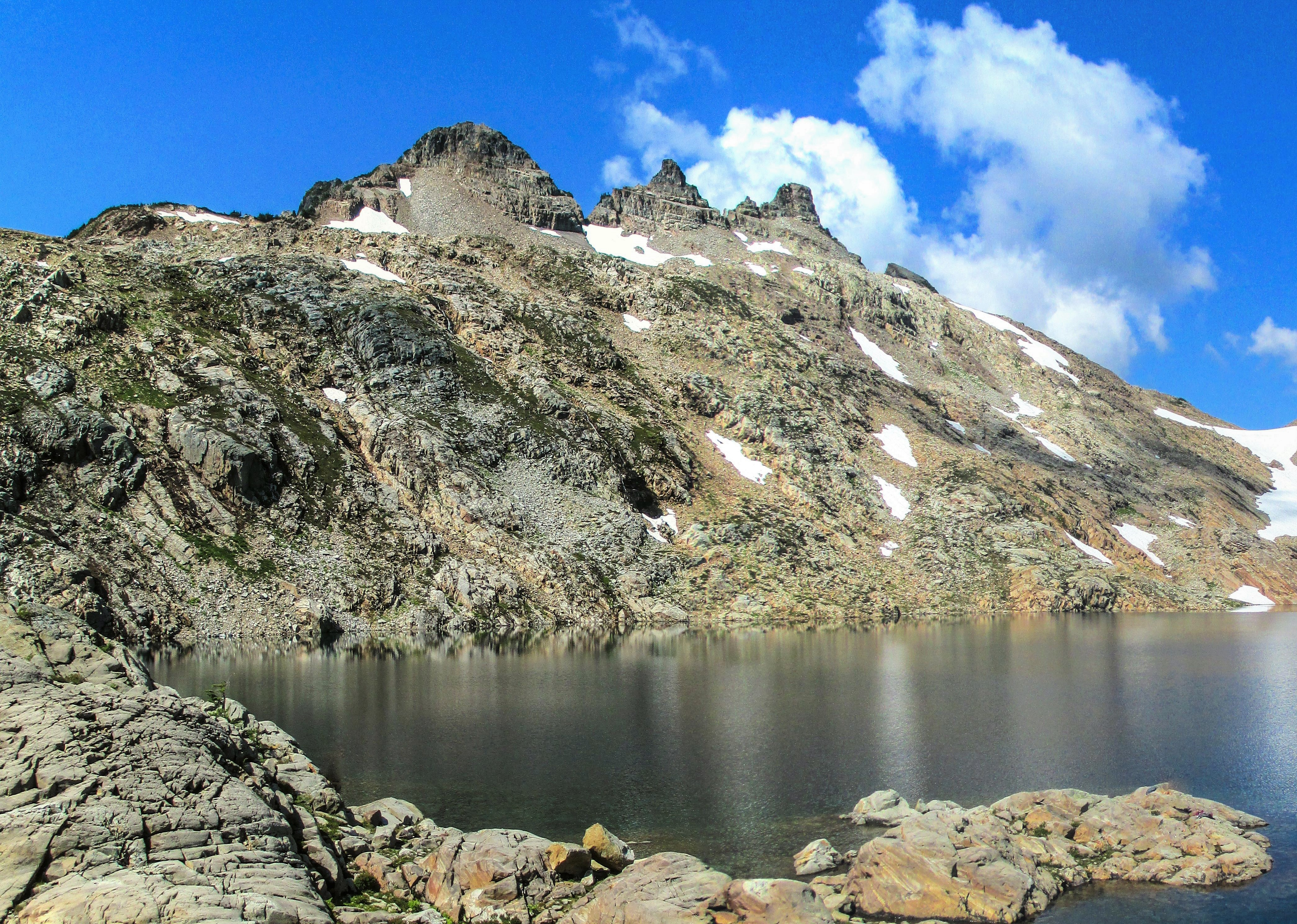
- Gothic Peak and Foggy Lake

Highest point
- Elevation: 6,213 ft (1,894 m)
- Prominence: 693 ft (211 m)
- Parent peak: Del Campo Peak
- Isolation: 0.57 mi (0.92 km)
- Coordinates: 47°59′01″N 121°28′36″W

Naming
- Etymology: William Gothic

Geography
- Location within Washington (state) Location within the United States
- Interactive map of Gothic Peak
- Country: United States
- State: Washington
- County: Snohomish
- Parent range: North Cascades; Cascade Range
- Topo map: USGS Monte Cristo

Geology
- Rock type(s): Sandstone, Quartz diorite, Conglomerate-Argillite

Climbing
- First ascent: 1934 by Don Blair, Willard Carr, Norval Grigg, Art Winder
- Easiest route: Scrambling class 3 North slope

Gothic Peak is a 6,213-foot (1,894-metre) multi-peak mountain summit located near the western edge of the North Cascades Range, in Snohomish County of Washington state. It is located south of Barlow Pass along the Mountain Loop Highway near the Monte Cristo area. It is situated on land administered by the Mount Baker-Snoqualmie National Forest. The mountain was named for early prospector William Gothic, who was one of the first to stake a claim in Gothic Basin. The mountain's name was officially adopted in 1967. The nearest higher peak is Del Campo Peak, 0.5 miles (0.80 km) to the northeast, and Foggy Pass is the low point between the two peaks. Foggy Lake lies in Gothic Basin below the east face of Gothic Peak and collects precipitation runoff which ultimately drains to South Fork Sauk River via Weden Creek. Runoff from the west side of the mountain drains into the Sultan River. The first ascent of the mountain was made on June 10, 1934, by Don Blair, Willard Carr, Norval Grigg, and Art Winder. In terms of catching favorable weather, the best months for climbing are July through September.

== Climate ==
Gothic Peak is located in the marine west coast climate zone of western North America. Most weather fronts originating in the Pacific Ocean travel northeast toward the Cascade Mountains. As fronts approach the North Cascades, they are forced upward by the peaks (orographic lift), causing them to drop their moisture in the form of rain or snow onto the Cascades. As a result, the west side of the North Cascades experiences high precipitation, especially during the winter months in the form of snowfall. Because of maritime influence, snow tends to be wet and heavy, resulting in high avalanche danger. During winter months, weather is usually cloudy, but, due to high pressure systems over the Pacific Ocean that intensify during summer months, there is often little or no cloud cover during the summer. Due to its temperate climate and proximity to the Pacific Ocean, areas west of the Cascade Crest very rarely experience temperatures below 0 °F (−18 °C) or above 80 °F (27 °C).

== Geology ==
The North Cascades features some of the most rugged topography in the Cascade Range with craggy peaks, ridges, and deep glacial valleys. Geological events occurring many years ago created the diverse topography and drastic elevation changes over the Cascade Range leading to various climate differences.

The history of the formation of the Cascade Mountains dates back millions of years ago to the late Eocene Epoch. With the North American Plate overriding the Pacific Plate, episodes of volcanic igneous activity persisted. In addition, small fragments of the oceanic and continental lithosphere called terranes created the North Cascades about 50 million years ago.

During the Pleistocene period dating back over two million years ago, glaciation advancing and retreating repeatedly scoured the landscape leaving deposits of rock debris. The U-shaped cross section of the river valleys is a result of recent glaciation. Uplift and faulting in combination with glaciation have been the dominant processes which have created the tall peaks and deep valleys of the North Cascades area.

== Gallery ==
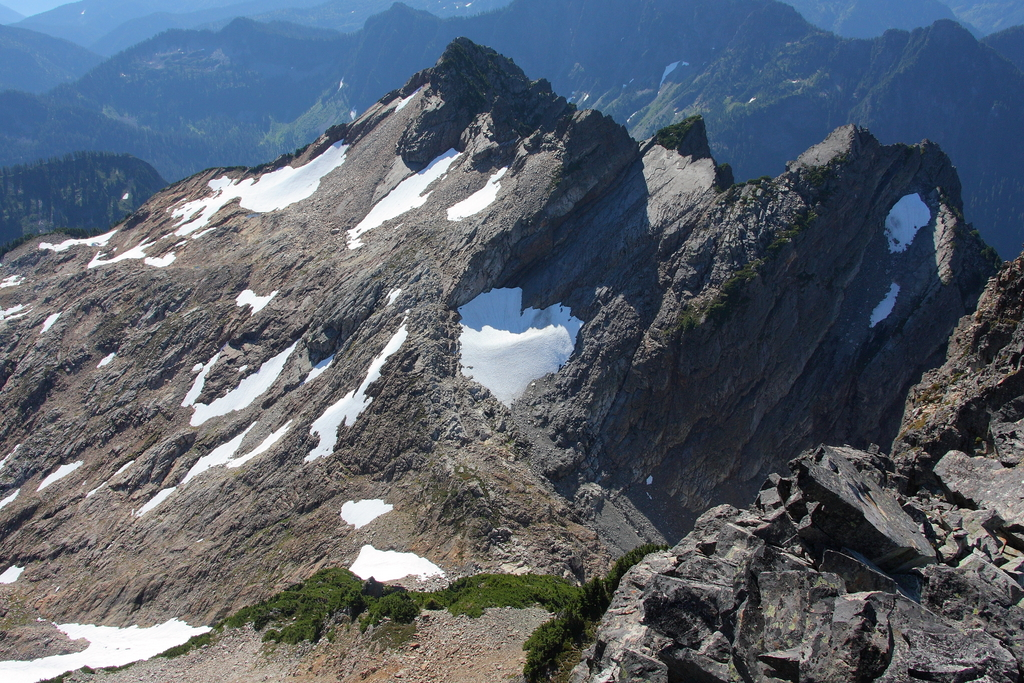
Gothic Peak from Del Campo Peak

== See also ==
- Geography of Washington (state)
- Geology of the Pacific Northwest
