= Foggy (disambiguation) =

Foggy usually describes a state of fog. It may also refer to:

== People ==
- Carl Fogarty (born 1965), British four-time World Superbike Champion nicknamed "Foggy"
- Foggy Lyttle (1944–2003), British guitarist
- Seymour Mullings (1931–2013), Jamaican politician nicknamed "Foggy"

== Fictional characters ==
- Foggy Nelson, a fictional character supporting Marvel Comics' Daredevil

== Other ==
- Foggy Peak, a mountain in Washington state

== See also ==
- Foggie (disambiguation)
- Fog (disambiguation)
