= Foggy Peak =

Mountain in Washington, United States

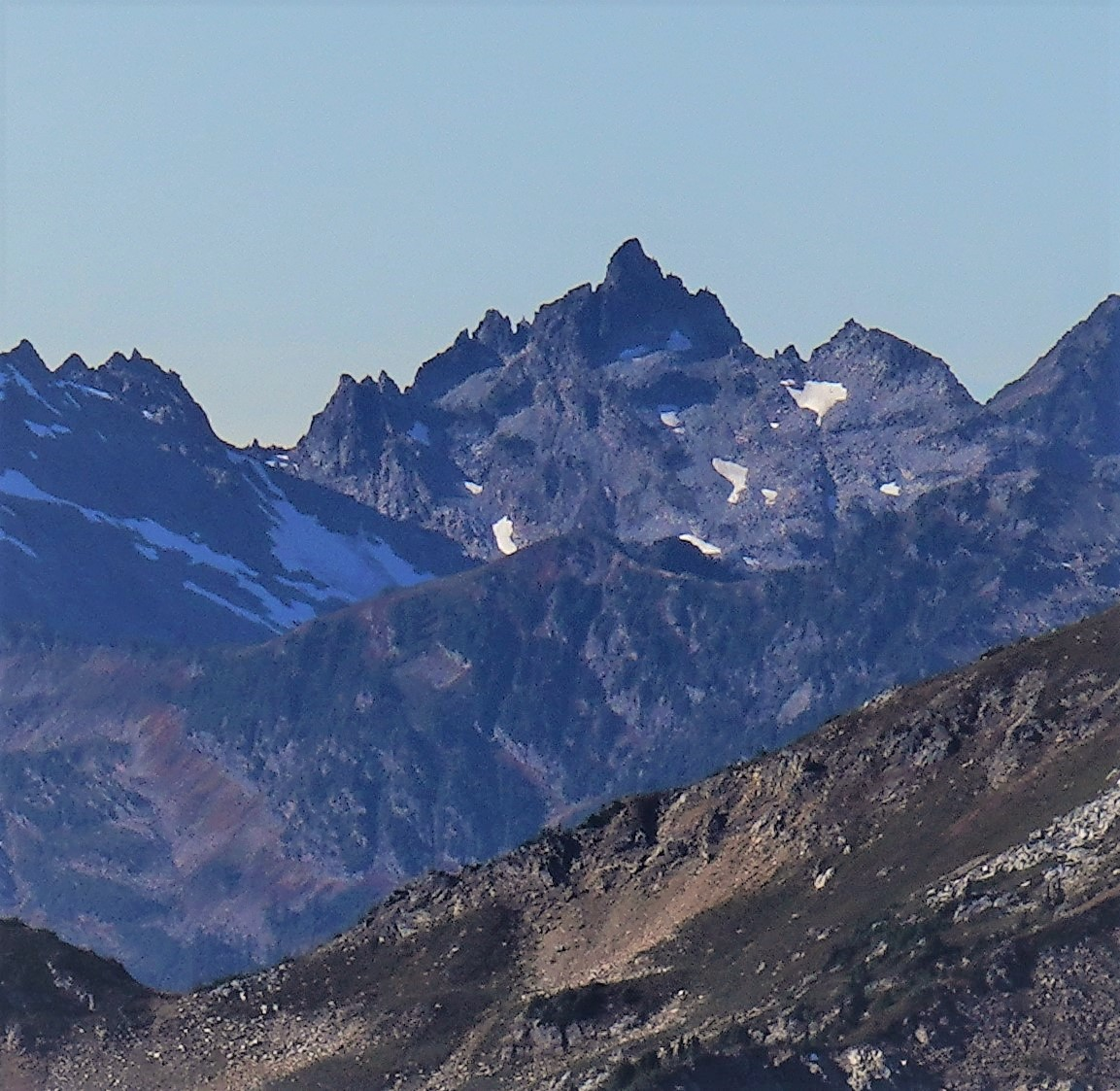
- Foggy Peak from the east-northeast

Highest point
- Elevation: 6,810 ft (2,076 m)
- Prominence: 750 ft (229 m)
- Parent peak: Cadet Peak (7,186 ft)
- Isolation: 1.16 mi (1.87 km)
- Coordinates: 47°59′52″N 121°21′57″W

Geography
- Location within Washington (state) Location within the United States
- Interactive map of Foggy Peak
- Country: United States
- State: Washington
- County: Snohomish
- Protected area: Henry M. Jackson Wilderness
- Parent range: Cascade Range
- Topo map: USGS Blanca Lake

Climbing
- First ascent: No record
- Easiest route: class 4 scrambling

Foggy Peak is a 6,810-foot-elevation (2,076-meter) mountain summit in Snohomish County of Washington state.

== Description ==
Foggy Peak is located in the North Cascades four miles (6.4 km) southeast of Barlow Pass and immediately northeast of the historic Monte Cristo townsite. It is set within the Henry M. Jackson Wilderness on land administered by the Mount Baker-Snoqualmie National Forest. Precipitation runoff from the mountain drains into tributaries of the Sauk River. Topographic relief is significant as the summit rises 4,000 feet (1,200 meters) above Monte Cristo in 1.5 mile (2.4 km) and 3,650 feet (1,110 meters) above Goat Lake in 1.35 mile. Foggy Peak's nearest higher neighbor is Cadet Peak, 1.16 mi (1.87 km) to the southeast. Back in the old mining days, the long sub-range stretching from Cadet Peak to Sheep Mountain was known as Pride of the Mountains Range. Cadet Peak was originally called Foggy Peak, for the Foggy Mine claim on the mountain's north slope, but the name was changed in 1896 and the Foggy Peak name was transferred to its present location. The peak's toponym was officially adopted by the U.S. Board on Geographic Names in 1918. When the board adopted the name, it described a glacier on the peak's east slope, however satellite imagery shows a mere snowfield remains.

== Climate ==
Foggy Peak is located in the marine west coast climate zone of western North America. Most weather fronts originating in the Pacific Ocean travel northeast toward the Cascade Mountains. As fronts approach the North Cascades, they are forced upward by the peaks of the Cascade Range (orographic lift), causing them to drop their moisture in the form of rain or snowfall onto the Cascades. As a result, the west side of the North Cascades experiences high precipitation, especially during the winter months in the form of snowfall. Because of maritime influence, snow tends to be wet and heavy, resulting in high avalanche danger. During winter months, weather is usually cloudy, but, due to high pressure systems over the Pacific Ocean that intensify during summer months, there is often little or no cloud cover during the summer. Due to its temperate climate and proximity to the Pacific Ocean, areas west of the Cascade Crest very rarely experience temperatures below 0 °F (−18 °C) or above 80 °F (27 °C). The months July through September offer the most favorable weather for viewing or climbing this peak.

== Geology ==
The North Cascades features some of the most rugged topography in the Cascade Range with craggy peaks, ridges, and deep glacial valleys. Geological events occurring many years ago created the diverse topography and drastic elevation changes over the Cascade Range leading to the various climate differences. These climate differences lead to vegetation variety defining the ecoregions in this area.

The history of the formation of the Cascade Mountains dates back millions of years ago to the late Eocene Epoch. With the North American Plate overriding the Pacific Plate, episodes of volcanic igneous activity persisted. Glacier Peak, a stratovolcano that is 14 mi (23 km) northeast of Foggy Peak, began forming in the mid-Pleistocene. In addition, small fragments of the oceanic and continental lithosphere called terranes created the North Cascades about 50 million years ago.

During the Pleistocene period dating back over two million years ago, glaciation advancing and retreating repeatedly scoured the landscape leaving deposits of rock debris. The U-shaped cross section of the river valleys is a result of recent glaciation. Uplift and faulting in combination with glaciation have been the dominant processes which have created the tall peaks and deep valleys of the North Cascades area.

== Gallery ==
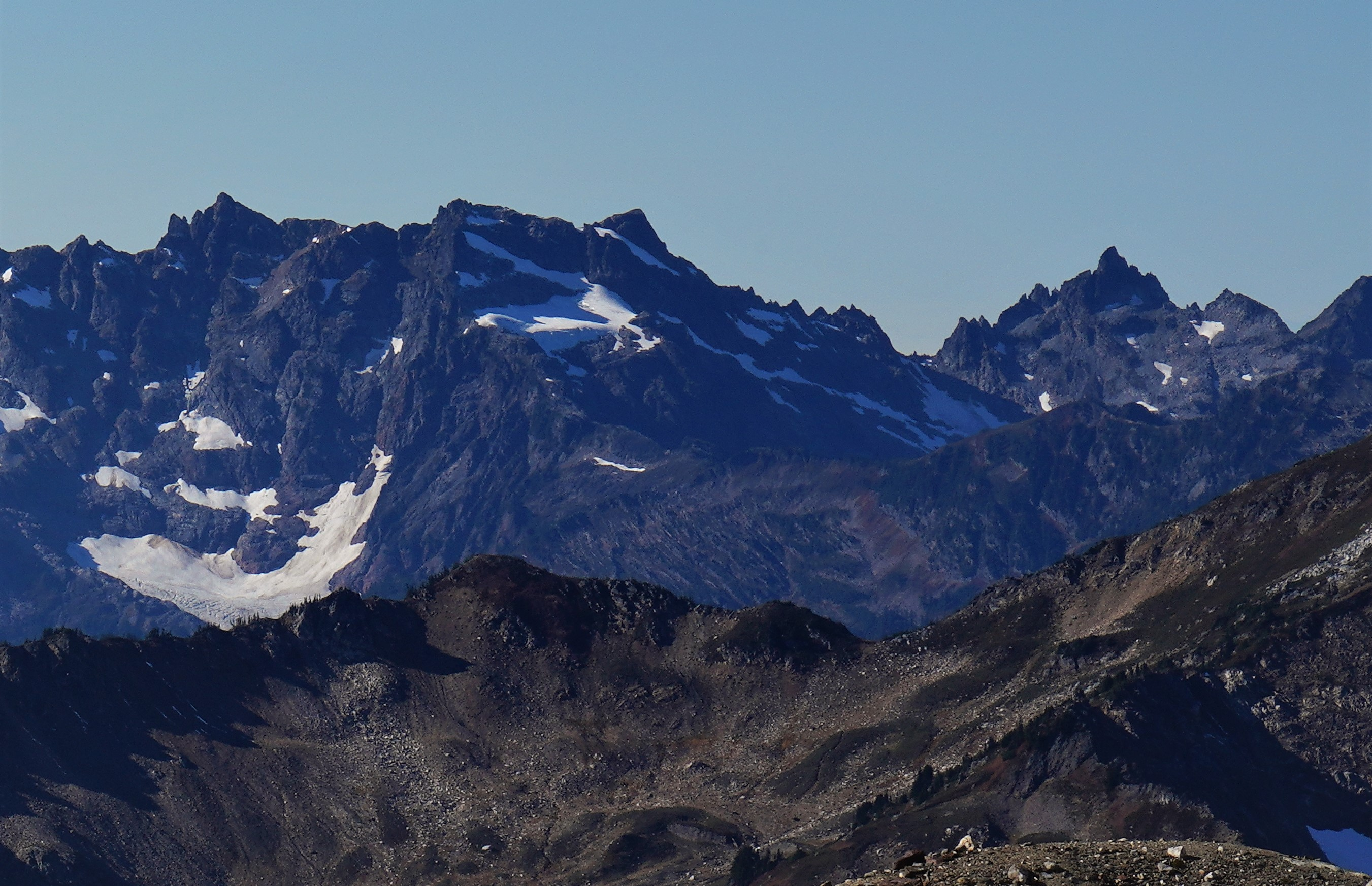
Cadet Peak (left) and Foggy Peak (right) viewed from northeast.

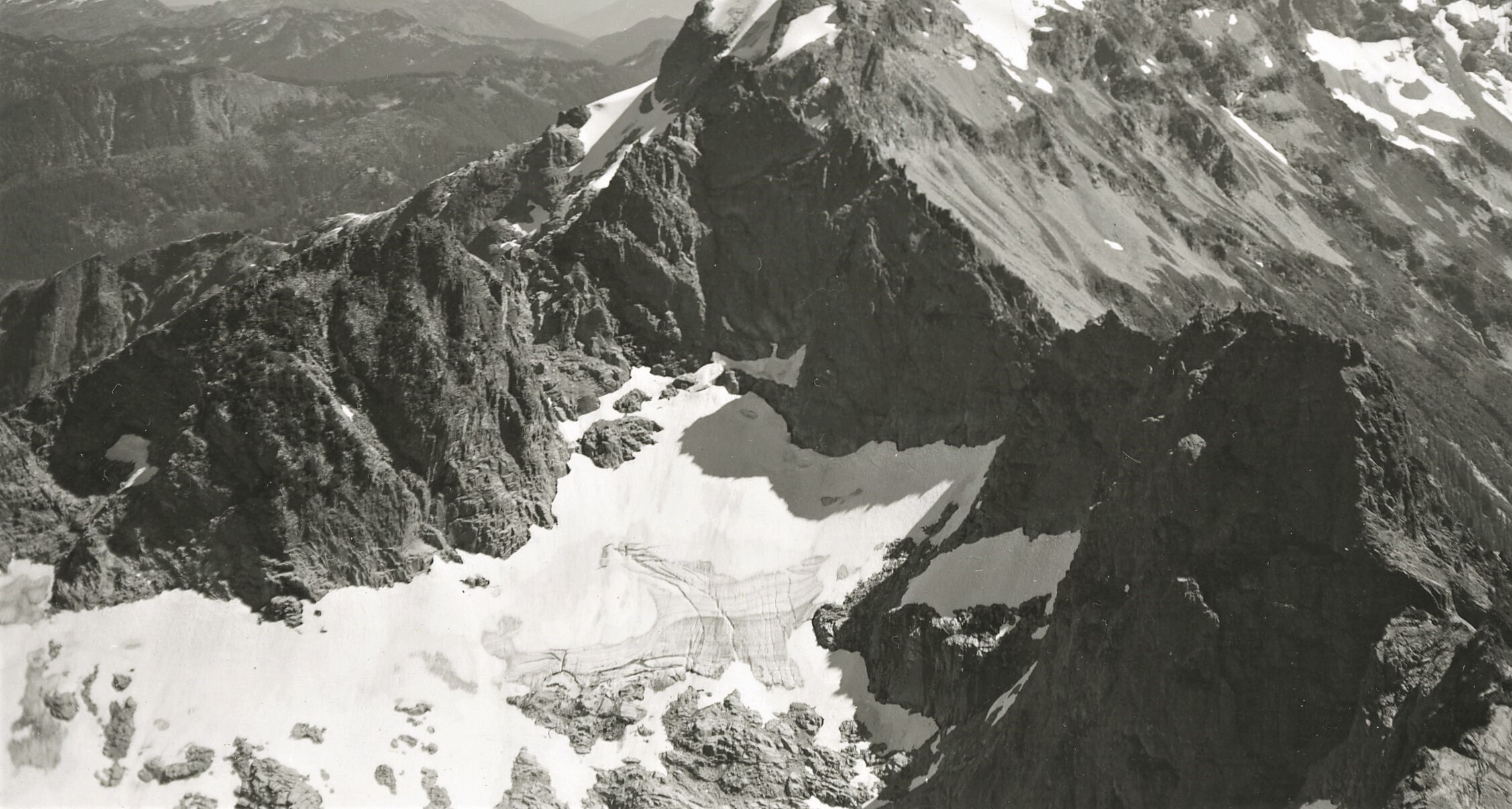
Northwest aspect (1963)

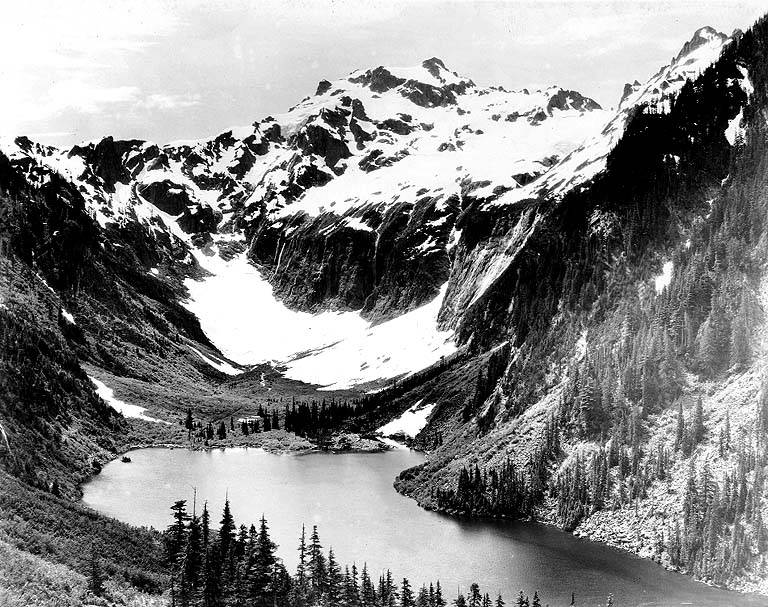
Goat Lake and Cadet Peak, with Foggy Peak upper right corner

== See also ==
- Geography of the North Cascades
- Geology of the Pacific Northwest
