= Foggie =

Foggie may refer to:

- Foggie, Aberdeenshire, Scottish village, (Aberchirder)
- Rickey Foggie (born 1966), American and Canadian football player, football coach
- David Foggie (1878–1948), Scots painter

== See also ==
- Foggy (disambiguation)
