= Cadet Peak =

Mountain in Washington (state), United States

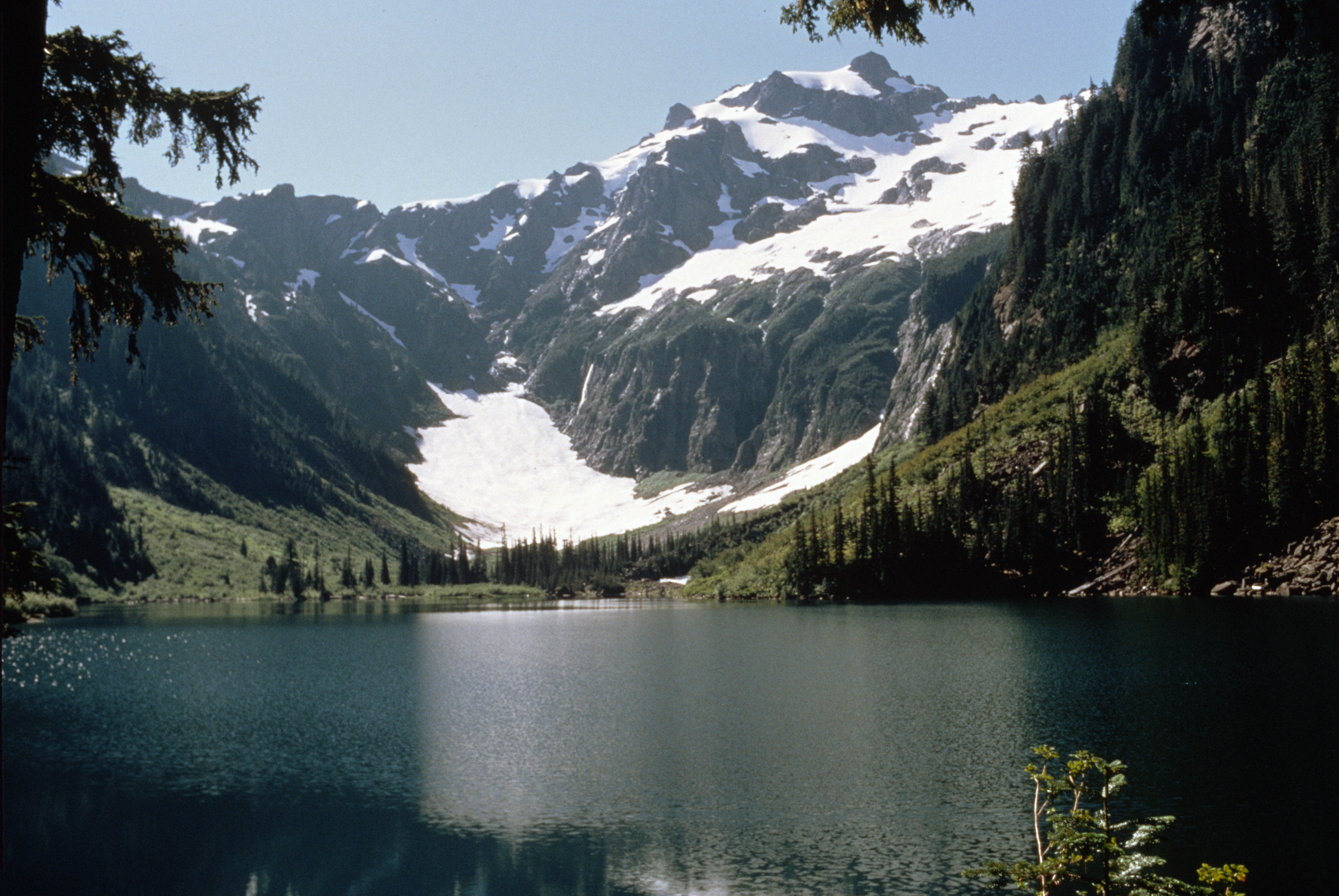
- Cadet Peak seen from Goat Lake

Highest point
- Elevation: 7,186 ft (2,190 m)
- Prominence: 706 ft (215 m)
- Parent peak: Kyes Peak
- Isolation: 1.59 mi (2.56 km)
- Coordinates: 47°59′07″N 121°20′58″W

Geography
- Location within Washington (state) Location within the United States
- Interactive map of
- Country: United States
- State: Washington
- County: Snohomish
- Protected area: Henry M. Jackson Wilderness
- Parent range: Cascade Range
- Topo map: USGS Blanca Lake

Geology
- Rock type: Breccia

Climbing
- Easiest route: Scrambling

Cadet Peak is a 7,186 ft (2,190 m) mountain summit near the western edge of the North Cascades, in Snohomish County of Washington state. The peak is located southeast of Barlow Pass along the Mountain Loop Highway, and two miles east of the historic Monte Cristo area. It is situated within the Henry M. Jackson Wilderness, on land administered by the Mount Baker-Snoqualmie National Forest. The mountain was originally called Foggy Peak, for the Foggy Mine claim on the mountain's north slope, but the name was changed in 1896 to its present name, and the Foggy Peak name was transferred to the peak immediately northwest of Cadet. Back in the old mining days, the long sub-range stretching from Cadet Peak to Sheep Mountain was known as Pride of the Mountains Range. Cadet's nearest higher neighbor is Kyes Peak, 1.59 mi (2.56 km) to the south-southeast. Precipitation runoff from the mountain drains into tributaries of the Sauk River.

== Climate ==
Cadet Peak is located in the marine west coast climate zone of western North America. Most weather fronts coming off the Pacific Ocean travel northeast toward the Cascade Mountains. As fronts approach the North Cascades, they are forced upward by the peaks (orographic lift), causing them to drop their moisture in the form of rain or snow onto the Cascades. As a result, the west side of the North Cascades experiences high precipitation, especially during the winter months in the form of snowfall. Because of maritime influence, snow tends to be wet and heavy, resulting in high avalanche danger. During winter months, weather is usually cloudy, but, due to high pressure systems over the Pacific Ocean that intensify during summer months, there is often little or no cloud cover during the summer. Due to its temperate climate and proximity to the Pacific Ocean, areas west of the Cascade Crest very rarely experience temperatures below 0 °F (−18 °C) or above 80 °F (27 °C). The months July through September offer the most favorable weather for viewing or climbing this peak.

== Geology ==
The North Cascades features some of the most rugged topography in the Cascade Range with craggy peaks, ridges, and deep glacial valleys. Geological events occurring many years ago created the diverse topography and drastic elevation changes over the Cascade Range leading to the various climate differences. These climate differences lead to vegetation variety defining the ecoregions in this area.

The history of the formation of the Cascade Mountains dates back millions of years ago to the late Eocene Epoch. With the North American Plate overriding the Pacific Plate, episodes of volcanic igneous activity persisted. In addition, small fragments of the oceanic and continental lithosphere called terranes created the North Cascades about 50 million years ago.

During the Pleistocene period dating back over two million years ago, glaciation advancing and retreating repeatedly scoured the landscape leaving deposits of rock debris. The U-shaped cross section of the river valleys is a result of recent glaciation. Uplift and faulting in combination with glaciation have been the dominant processes which have created the tall peaks and deep valleys of the North Cascades area.

== Gallery ==
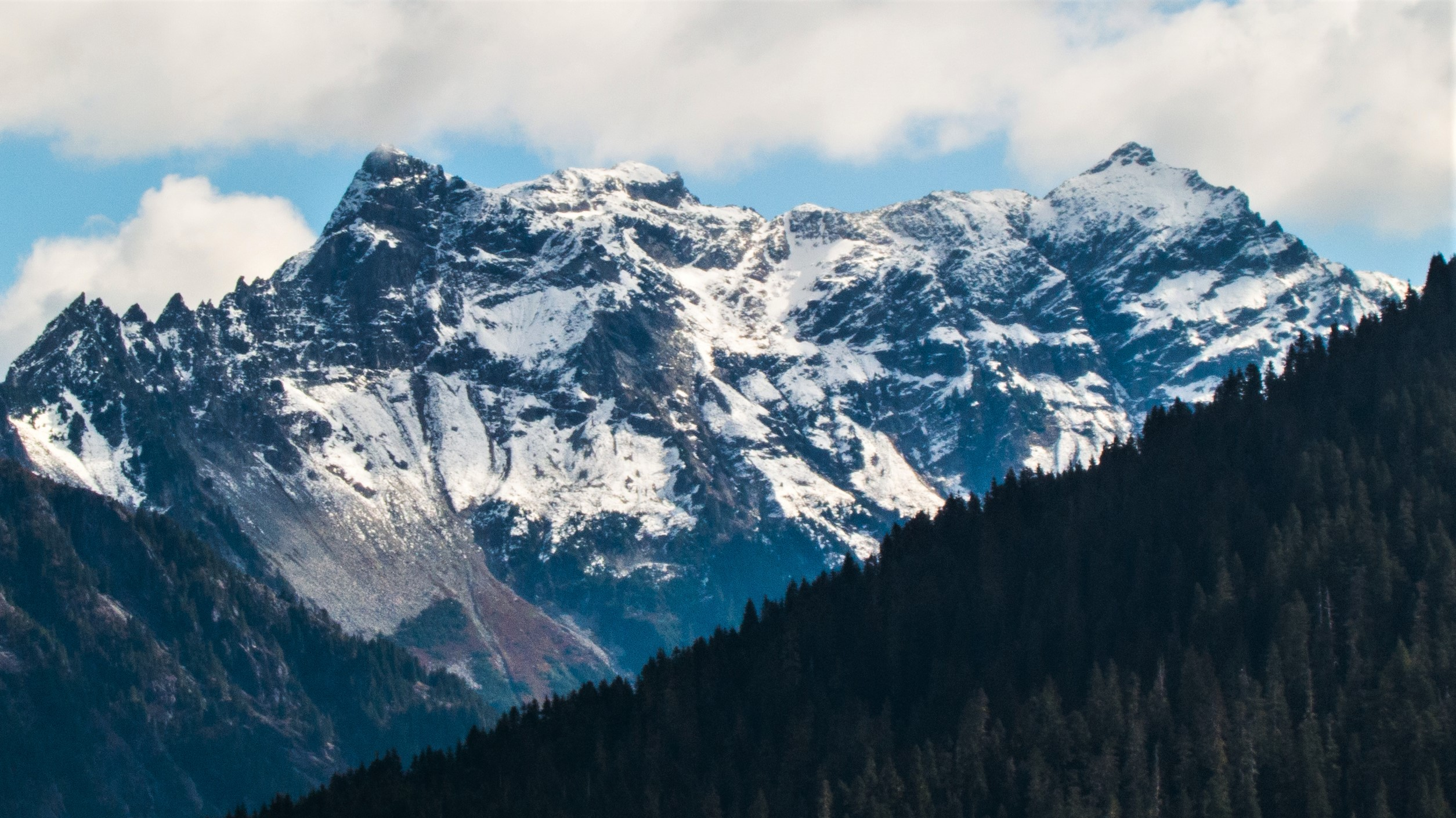
Cadet Peak, west aspect

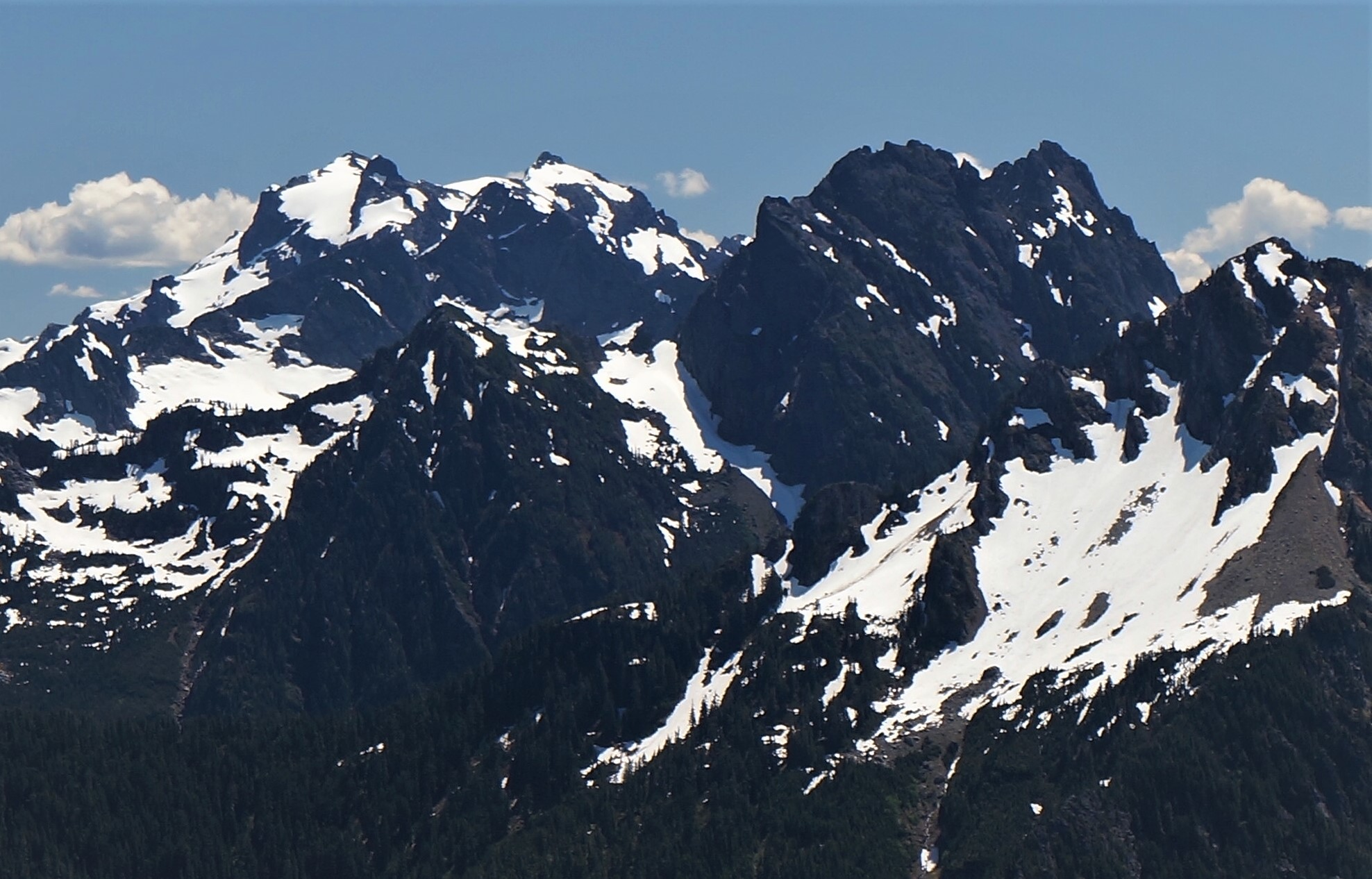
Cadet Peak (left) and Gemini Peaks (right) seen from Dickerman Mountain

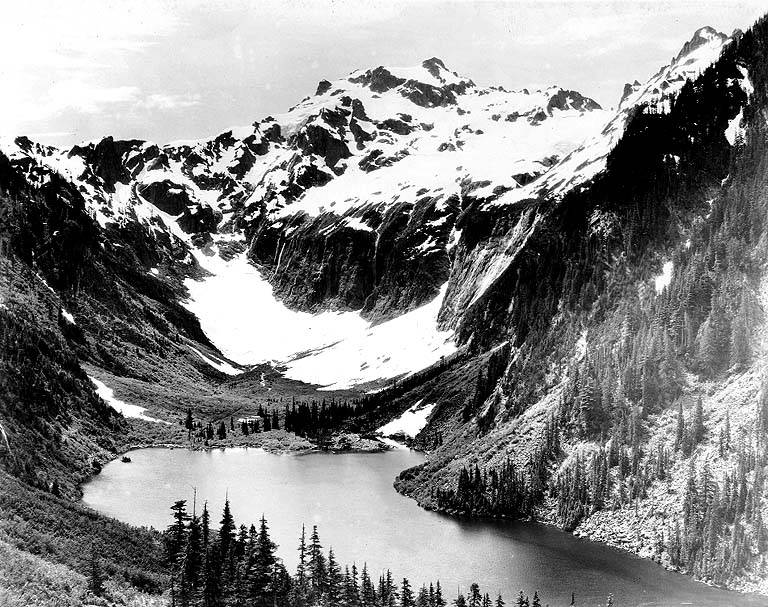
Goat Lake, Cadet Peak, ca 1920

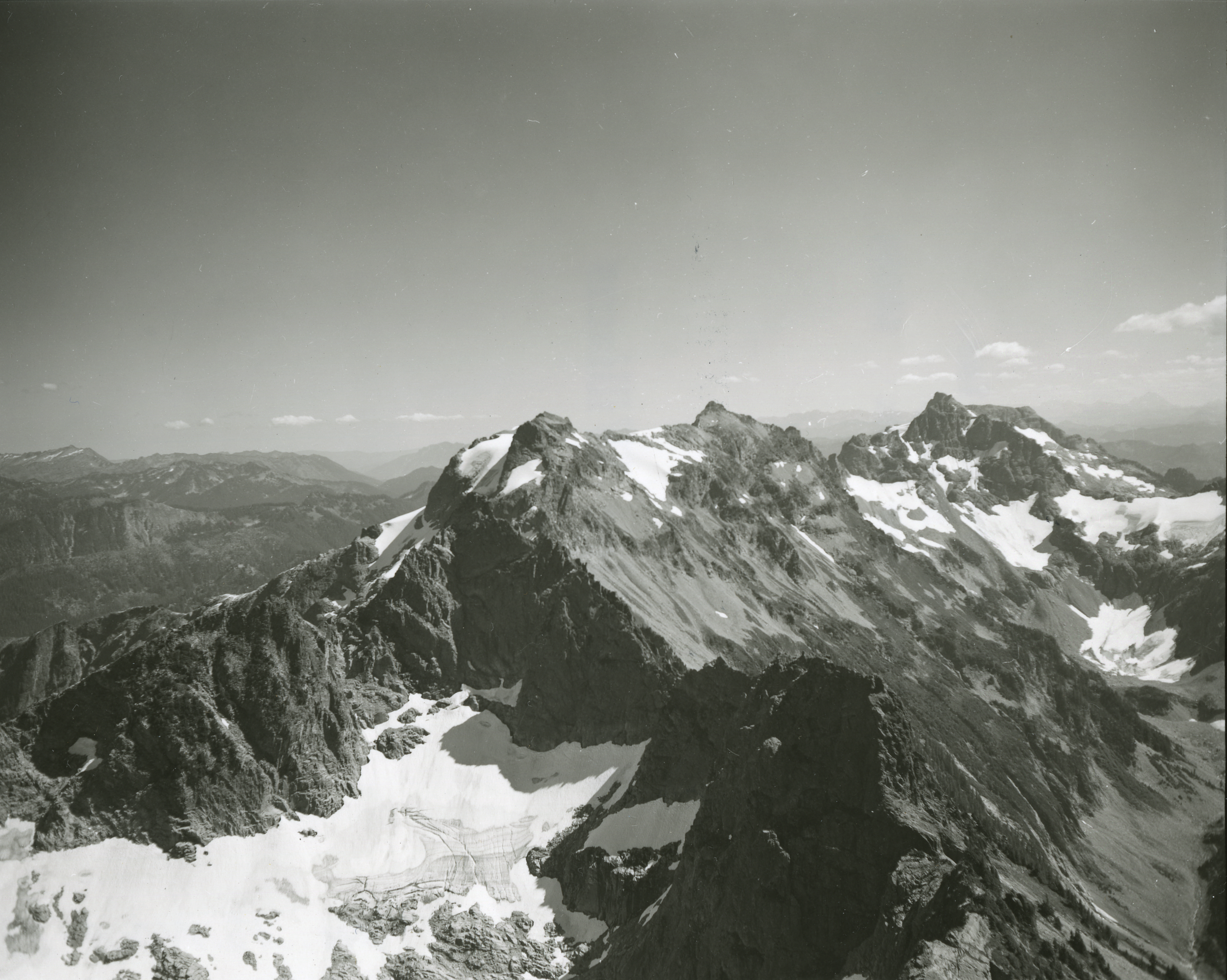
Cadet Peak centered, from northwest

== See also ==
- Geography of the North Cascades
- Geology of the Pacific Northwest
- Wilmans Peaks
