= Goat Lake (Snohomish County, Washington) =

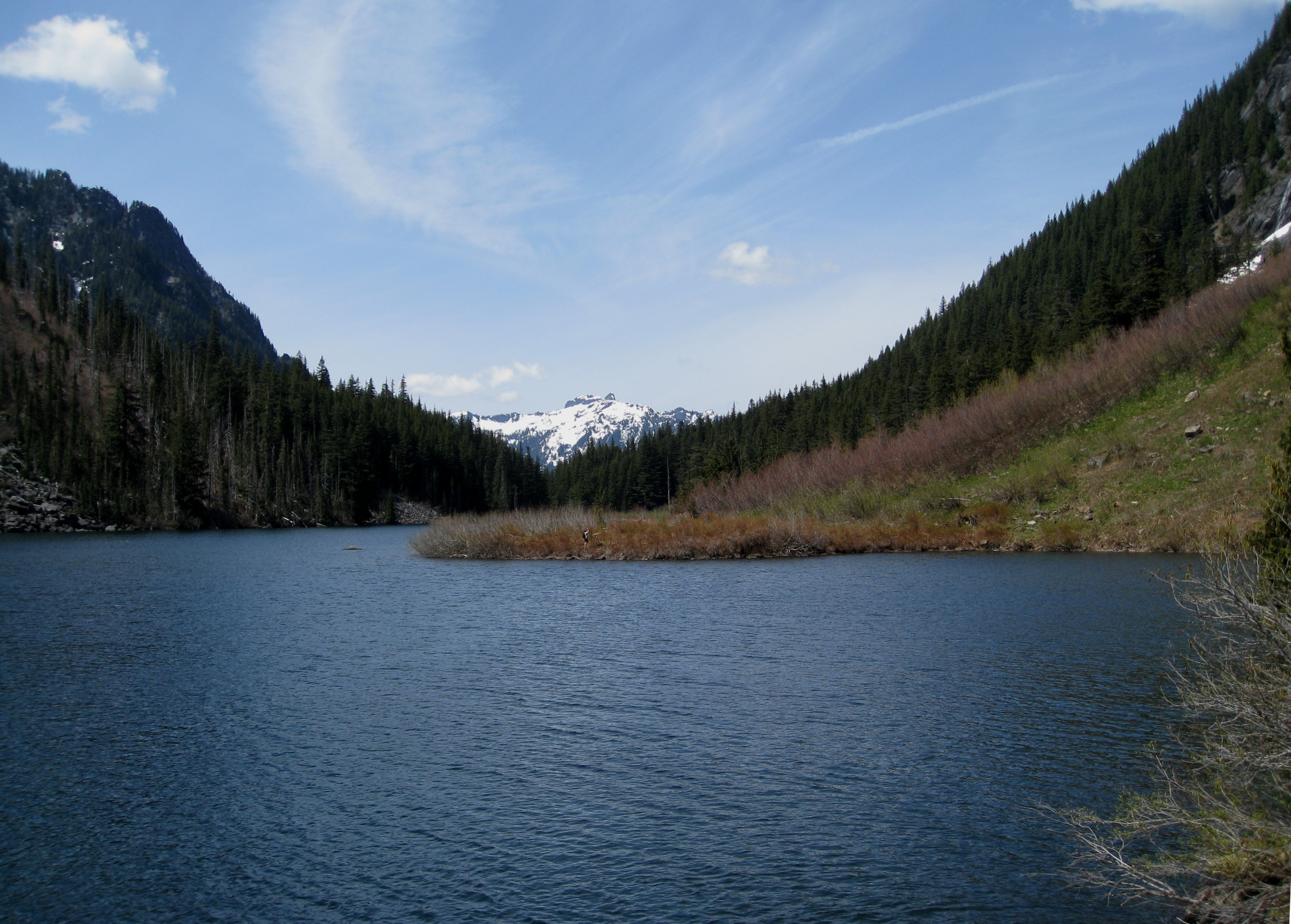
- Looking west towards Foggy Peak

- Location within Washington (state) Location within the United States
- Location: Snohomish County, Washington
- Coordinates: 48°1′4″N 121°21′3″W
- Lake type: Glacial lake
- Primary inflows: Elliott Creek
- Primary outflows: Elliott Creek
- Basin countries: United States
- Surface area: 58.4 acres (23.6 ha)
- Surface elevation: 3,166 ft (965 m)
- Islands: 0

Goat Lake is a glacial lake located in Snohomish County, Washington and in the Mount Baker-Snoqualmie National Forest. The lake is a popular area for hiking, backpacking, and fishing.

== Gallery ==
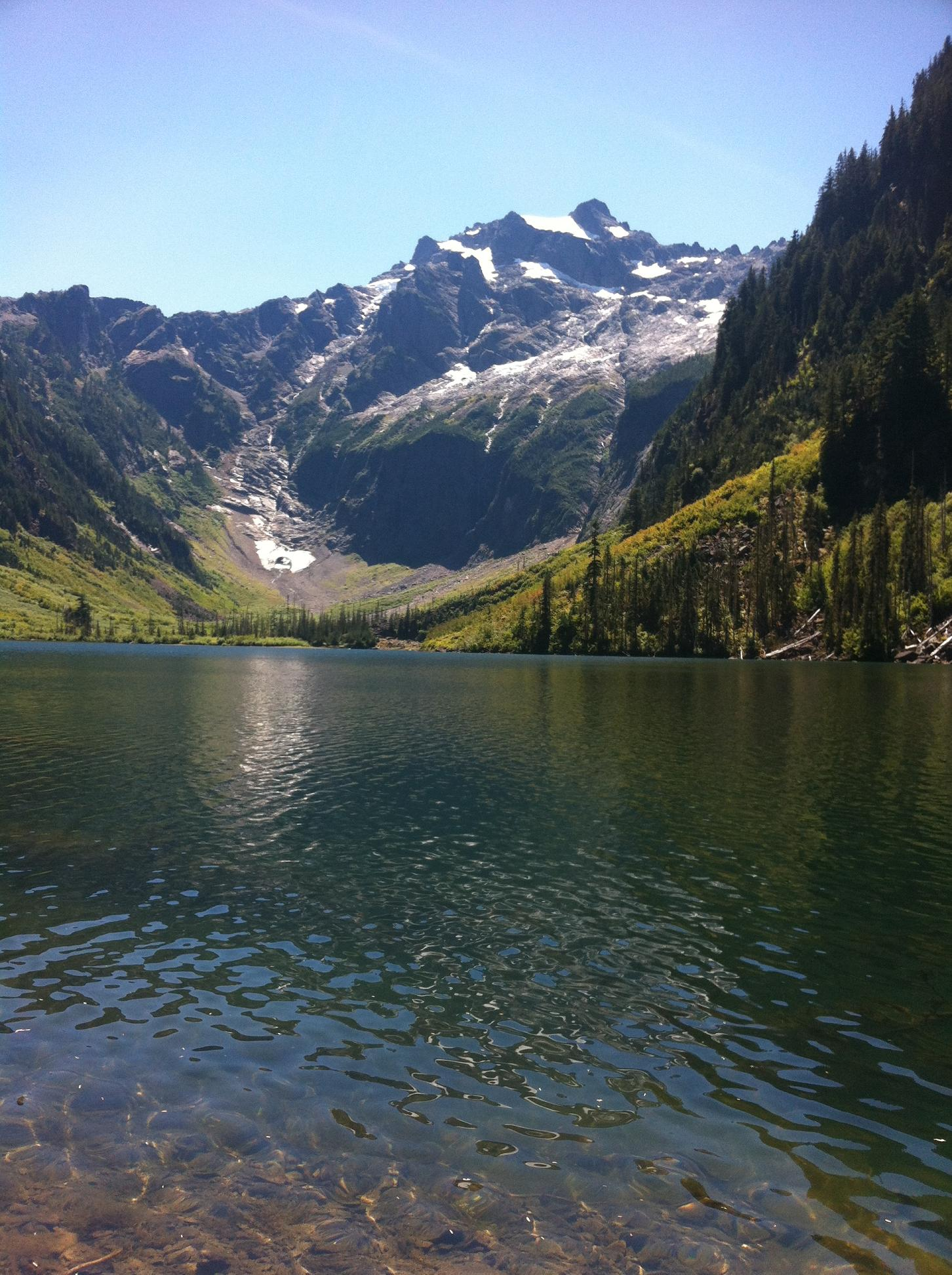
Goat Lake looking south toward Cadet Peak.

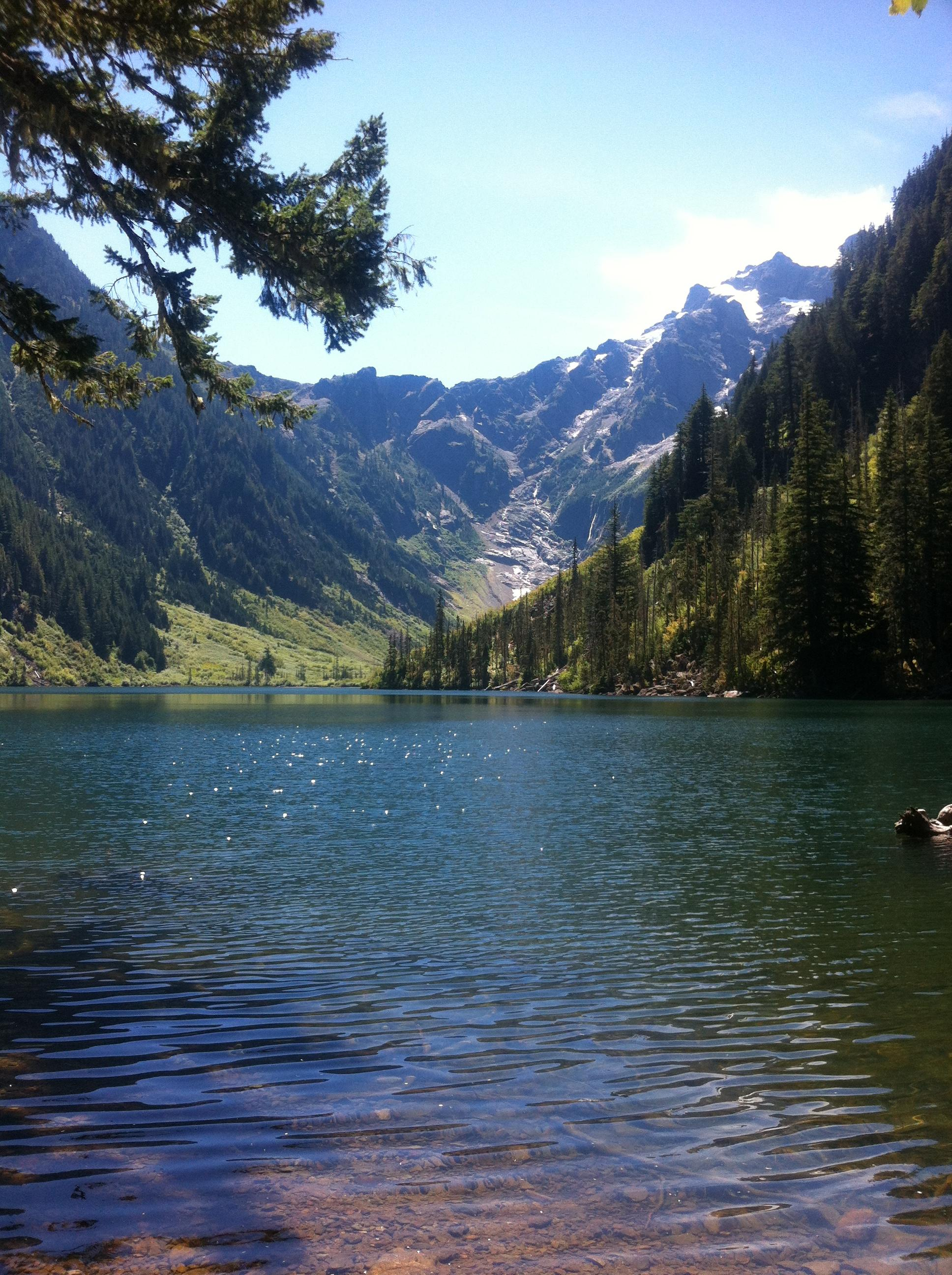
Goat Lake from northern shore.

== See also ==
- Gothic Basin
