= Portal Peak (Washington) =

Mountain in Washington (state), United States

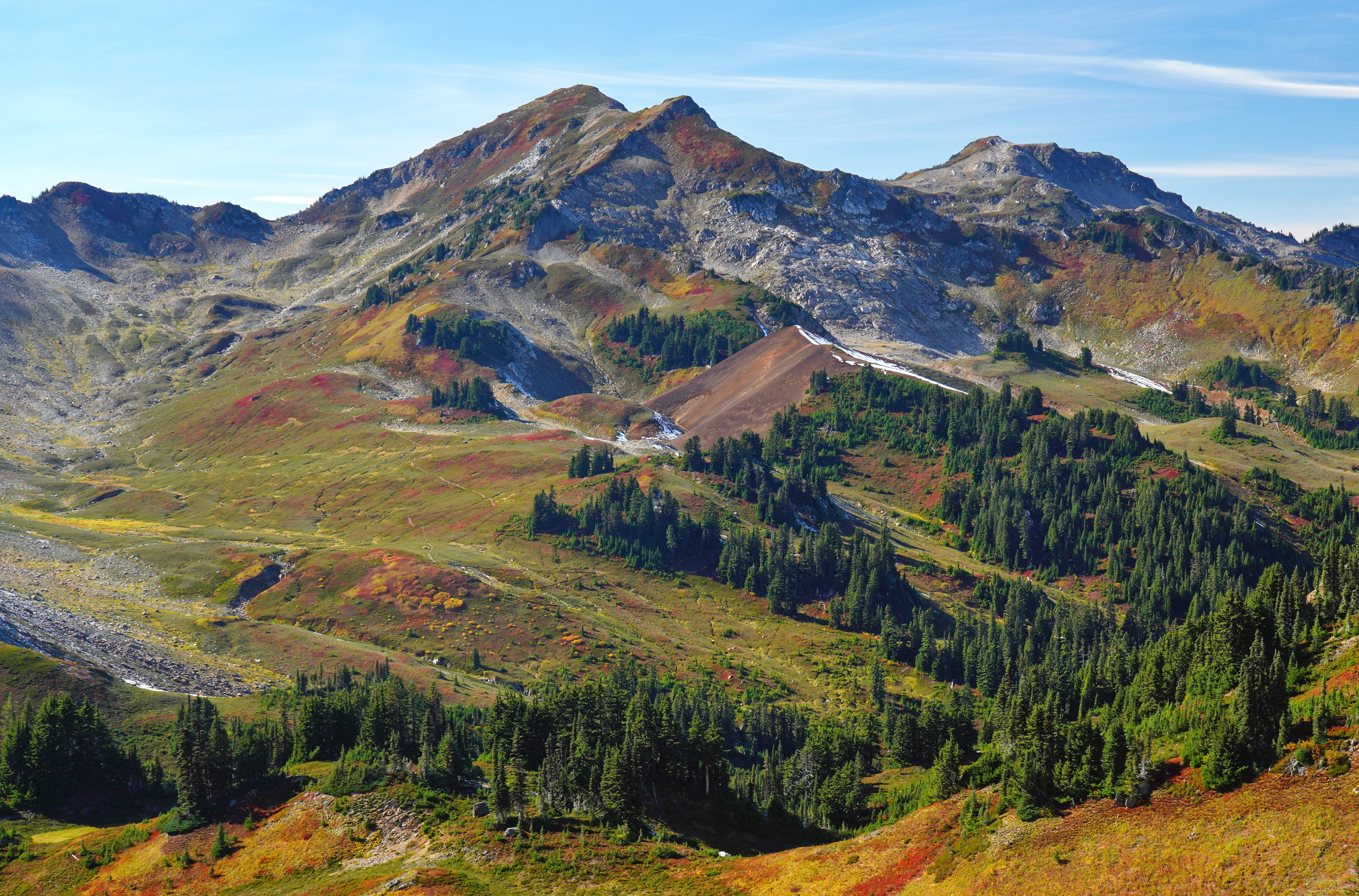
- East aspect

Highest point
- Elevation: 6,999 ft (2,133 m)
- Prominence: 479 ft (146 m)
- Parent peak: White Mountain (7,043 ft)
- Isolation: 1.36 mi (2.19 km)
- Coordinates: 48°02′57″N 121°10′46″W

Geography
- Location within Washington (state) Location within the United States
- Interactive map of Portal Peak
- Country: United States
- State: Washington
- County: Snohomish
- Protected area: Glacier Peak Wilderness
- Parent range: Cascade Range; North Cascades
- Topo map: USGS Glacier Peak West

Geology
- Rock age: Late Cretaceous
- Rock type: Gneiss

Portal Peak is a 6,999-foot (2,133-metre) mountain summit in Snohomish County, Washington, United States.

== Description ==
Portal Peak is situated 1.5 miles (2.4 km) west of the crest of the Cascade Range in the Glacier Peak Wilderness on land managed by Mount Baker-Snoqualmie National Forest. It is part of the North Cascades. Portal Peak is located immediately northwest of Red Pass, and 1.36 mi (2.19 km) west-northwest of line parent White Mountain. The Pacific Crest Trail traverses the southeast slope of the peak as it crosses Red Pass. Precipitation runoff from the peak drains to the Sauk River via the White Chuck River from the northeast slope, and to the North Fork Sauk River from the southwest slope. Topographic relief is significant as the summit rises 4,000 feet (1,219 meters) above the North Fork Sauk River in 1.5 miles (2.4 km). The mountain's toponym has been officially adopted by the United States Board on Geographic Names as named by Nels Bruseth in 1917.

== Geology ==
The North Cascades feature some of the most rugged topography in the Cascade Range with craggy peaks, spires, ridges, and deep glacial valleys. Geological events occurring many years ago created the diverse topography and drastic elevation changes over the Cascade Range leading to the various climate differences.

The history of the formation of the Cascade Mountains dates back millions of years ago to the late Eocene Epoch. With the North American Plate overriding the Pacific Plate, episodes of volcanic igneous activity persisted. Glacier Peak, a stratovolcano that is 5 mi (8.0 km) northeast of Portal Peak, began forming in the mid-Pleistocene. Due to Glacier Peak's proximity to Portal Peak, volcanic ash is common in the area and provides fertile soil for an abundance of wildflowers.

During the Pleistocene period dating back over two million years ago, glaciation advancing and retreating repeatedly scoured the landscape leaving deposits of rock debris. The U-shaped cross section of the river valleys is a result of recent glaciation. Uplift and faulting in combination with glaciation have been the dominant processes which have created the tall peaks and deep valleys of the North Cascades area.

== Climate ==
Portal Peak is located in the marine west coast climate zone of western North America. Most weather fronts originating in the Pacific Ocean travel northeast toward the Cascade Mountains. As fronts approach the North Cascades, they are forced upward by the peaks of the Cascade Range (orographic lift), causing them to drop their moisture in the form of rain or snowfall onto the Cascades. As a result, the west side of the North Cascades experiences high precipitation, especially during the winter months in the form of snowfall. Because of maritime influence, snow tends to be wet and heavy, resulting in high avalanche danger. During winter months, weather is usually cloudy, but due to high pressure systems over the Pacific Ocean that intensify during summer months, there is often little or no cloud cover during the summer. Due to its temperate climate and proximity to the Pacific Ocean, areas west of the Cascade Crest very rarely experience temperatures below 0 °F (−18 °C) or above 80 °F (27 °C).

== Gallery ==
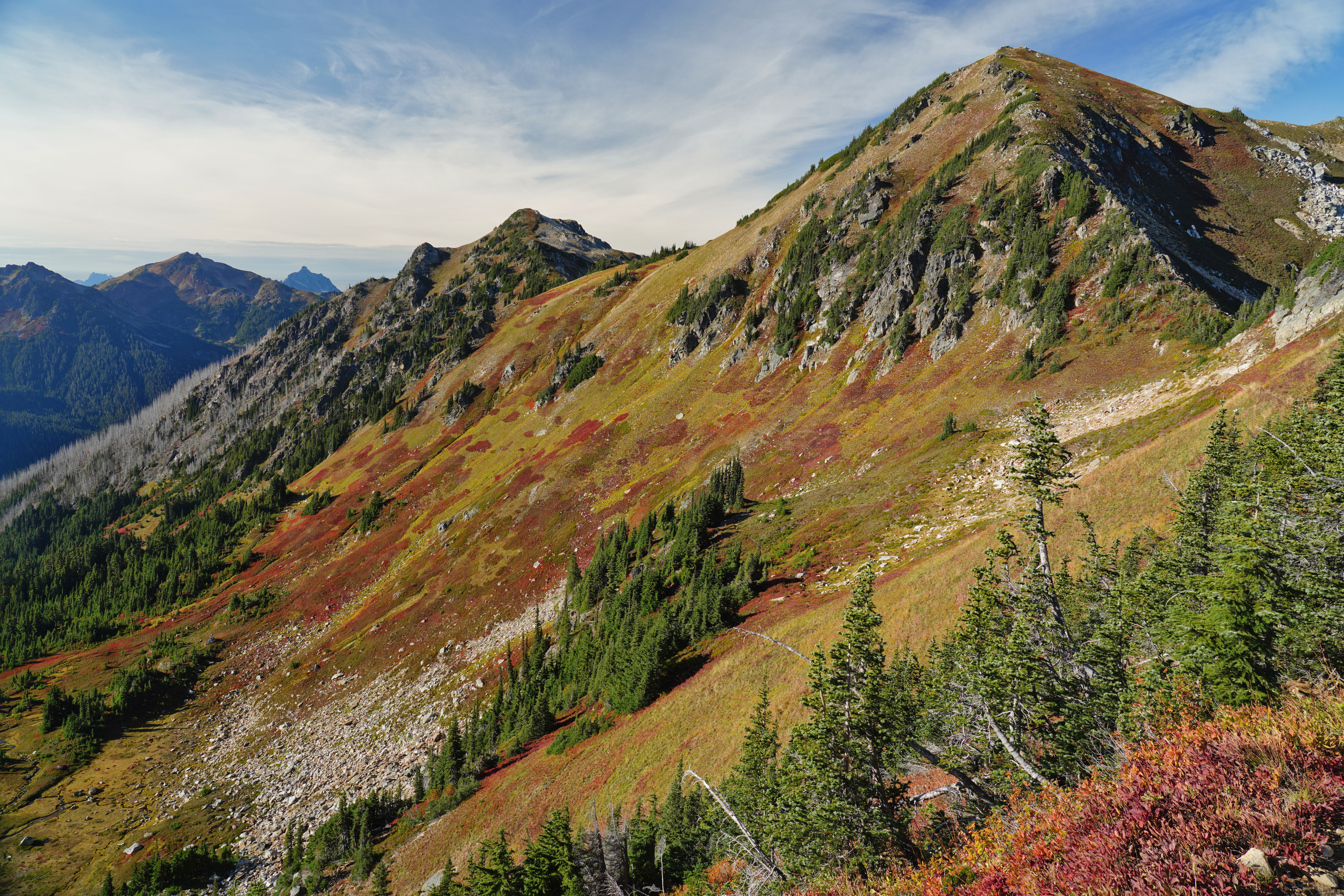
South aspect of Portal Peak to right

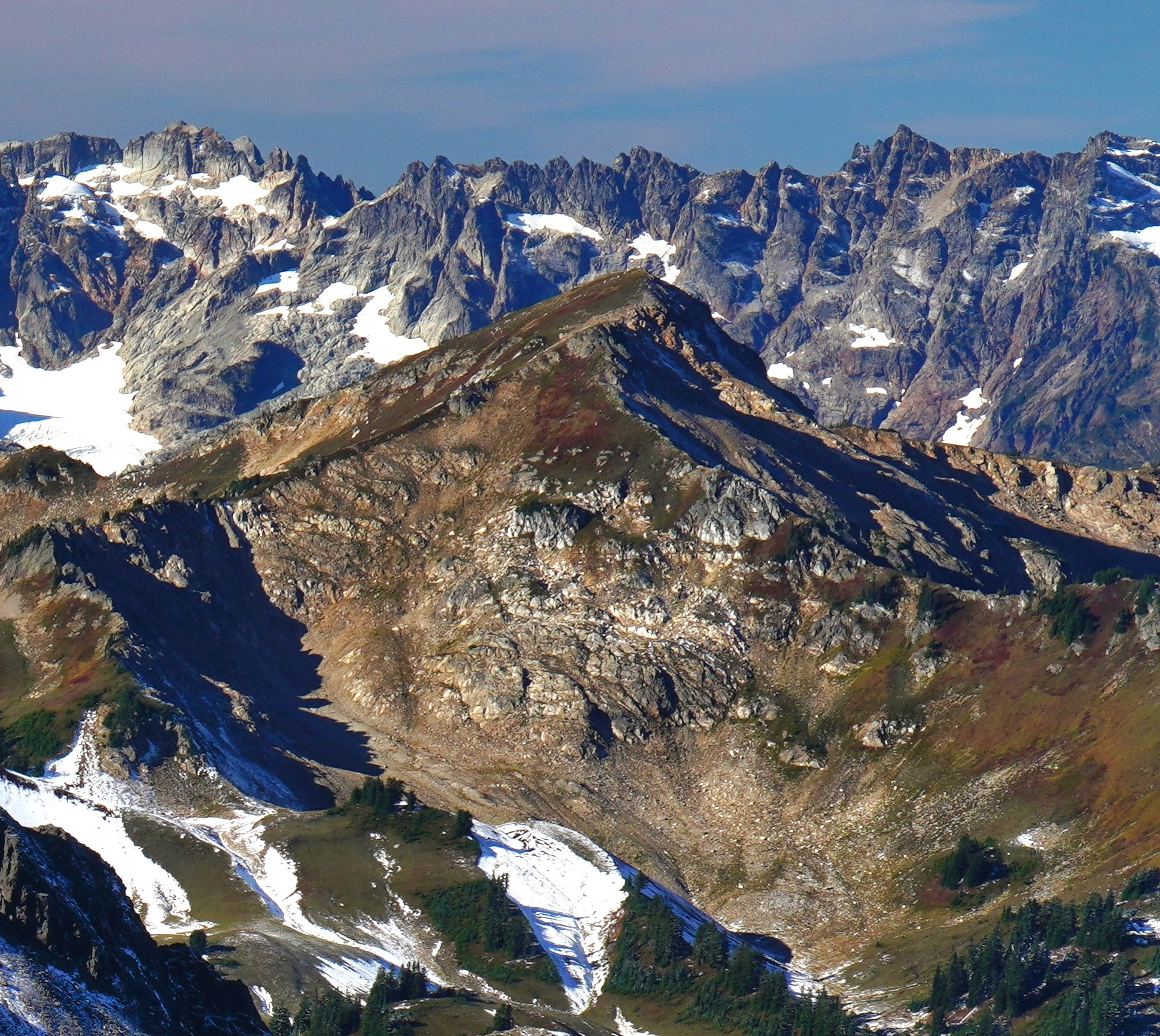
Northeast aspect of Portal Peak (centered). Monte Cristo Range on the horizon.

== See also ==
- List of mountain peaks of Washington (state)
- Geography of the North Cascades
