= Baekos Peak =

Mountain in Washington (state), United States

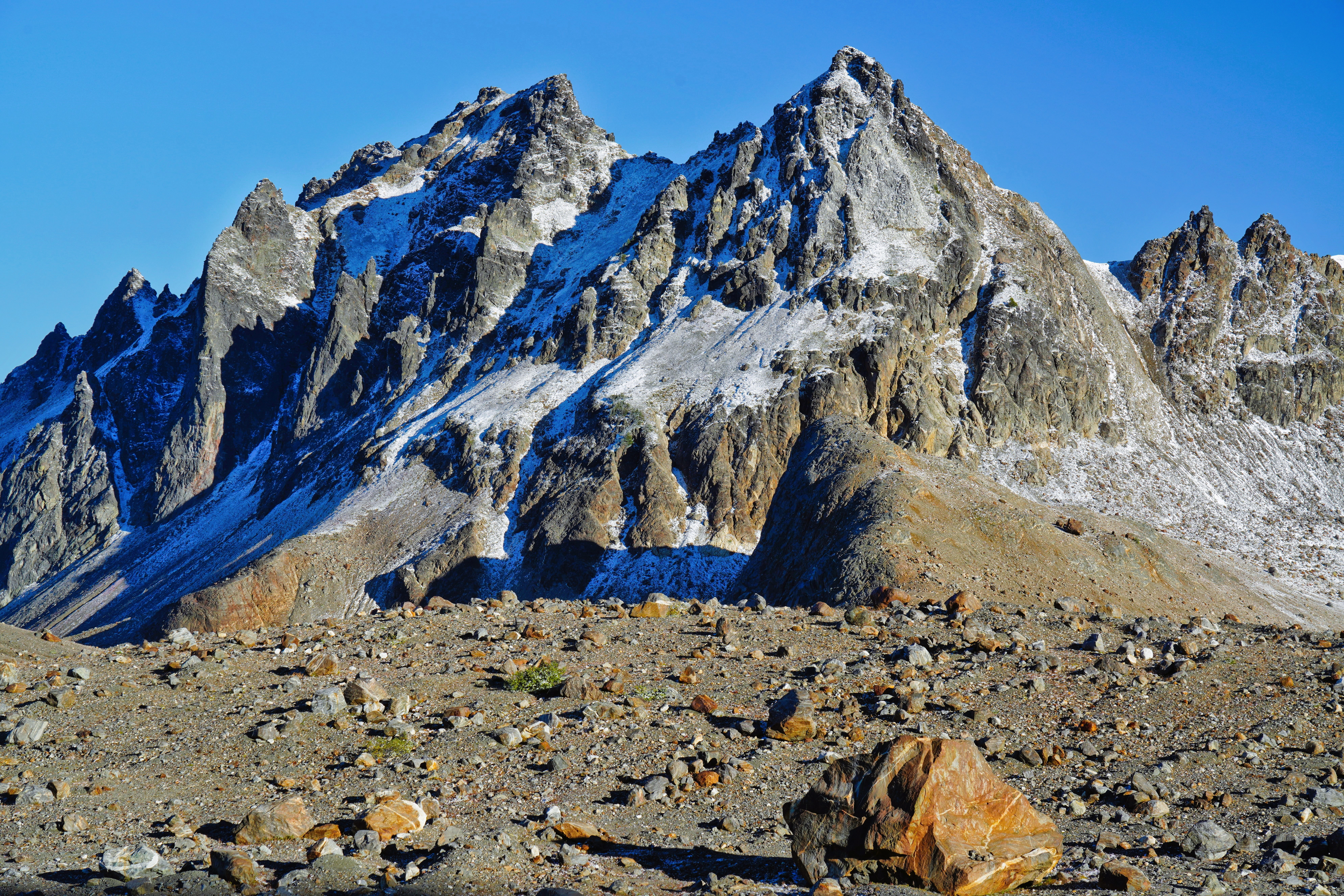
- South aspect

Highest point
- Elevation: 7,529 ft (2,295 m)
- Prominence: 486 ft (148 m)
- Parent peak: Glacier Gap Peak (7,7373 ft)
- Isolation: 0.99 mi (1.59 km)
- Coordinates: 48°04′35″N 121°07′57″W

Geography
- Location within Washington (state) Location within the United States
- Interactive map of Baekos Peak
- Country: United States
- State: Washington
- County: Snohomish
- Protected area: Glacier Peak Wilderness
- Parent range: Cascade Range; North Cascades
- Topo map: USGS Glacier Peak West

Geology
- Rock type: Schist

Baekos Peak is a 7,529-foot (2,295-metre) mountain summit in Snohomish County, Washington, United States.

== Description ==
Baekos Peak is situated two miles (3.2 km) west of the crest of the Cascade Range in the Glacier Peak Wilderness on land managed by Mount Baker-Snoqualmie National Forest. It is part of the North Cascades and is located 2.5 mi (4.0 km) south of Glacier Peak. The Pacific Crest Trail traverses the western foot of the peak. Precipitation runoff from the peak drains into Baekos Creek and headwaters of the White Chuck River. Topographic relief is significant as the summit rises over 3,500 feet (1,067 meters) above the river in one mile (1.6 km). This mountain's toponym has not been officially adopted by the United States Board on Geographic Names, and it will remain unofficial as long as the USGS policy of not adopting new toponyms in designated wilderness areas remains in effect. However, it is labeled as "7529" on USGS topographical maps, which corresponds to its elevation. The peak is named in association with Baekos Creek which is officially named.

== Geology ==
The North Cascades feature some of the most rugged topography in the Cascade Range with craggy peaks, spires, ridges, and deep glacial valleys. Geological events occurring many years ago created the diverse topography and drastic elevation changes over the Cascade Range leading to the various climate differences.

The history of the formation of the Cascade Mountains dates back millions of years ago to the late Eocene Epoch. With the North American Plate overriding the Pacific Plate, episodes of volcanic igneous activity persisted. Glacier Peak, a stratovolcano that is 2.5 mi (4.0 km) north of Baekos Peak, began forming in the mid-Pleistocene.

During the Pleistocene period dating back over two million years ago, glaciation advancing and retreating repeatedly scoured the landscape leaving deposits of rock debris. The U-shaped cross section of the river valleys is a result of recent glaciation. Uplift and faulting in combination with glaciation have been the dominant processes which have created the tall peaks and deep valleys of the North Cascades area.

== Climate ==
Baekos Peak is located in the marine west coast climate zone of western North America. Most weather fronts originating in the Pacific Ocean travel northeast toward the Cascade Mountains. As fronts approach the North Cascades, they are forced upward by the peaks of the Cascade Range (orographic lift), causing them to drop their moisture in the form of rain or snowfall onto the Cascades. As a result, the west side of the North Cascades experiences high precipitation, especially during the winter months in the form of snowfall. Because of maritime influence, snow tends to be wet and heavy, resulting in high avalanche danger. During winter months, weather is usually cloudy, but due to high pressure systems over the Pacific Ocean that intensify during summer months, there is often little or no cloud cover during the summer. Due to its temperate climate and proximity to the Pacific Ocean, areas west of the Cascade Crest very rarely experience temperatures below 0 °F (−18 °C) or above 80 °F (27 °C).

== Gallery ==
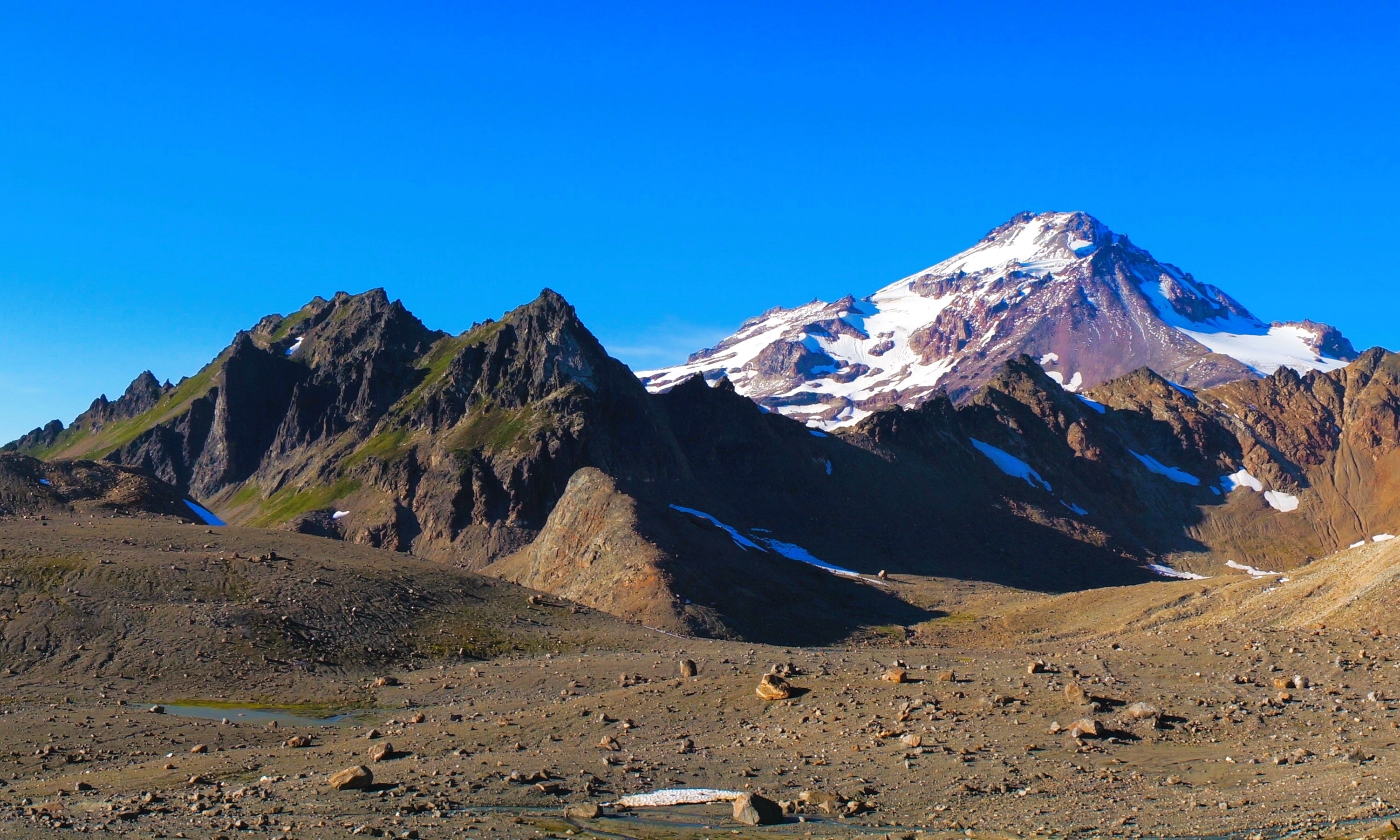
Baekos Peak (left) and Glacier Peak (right) viewed from White Chuck Basin

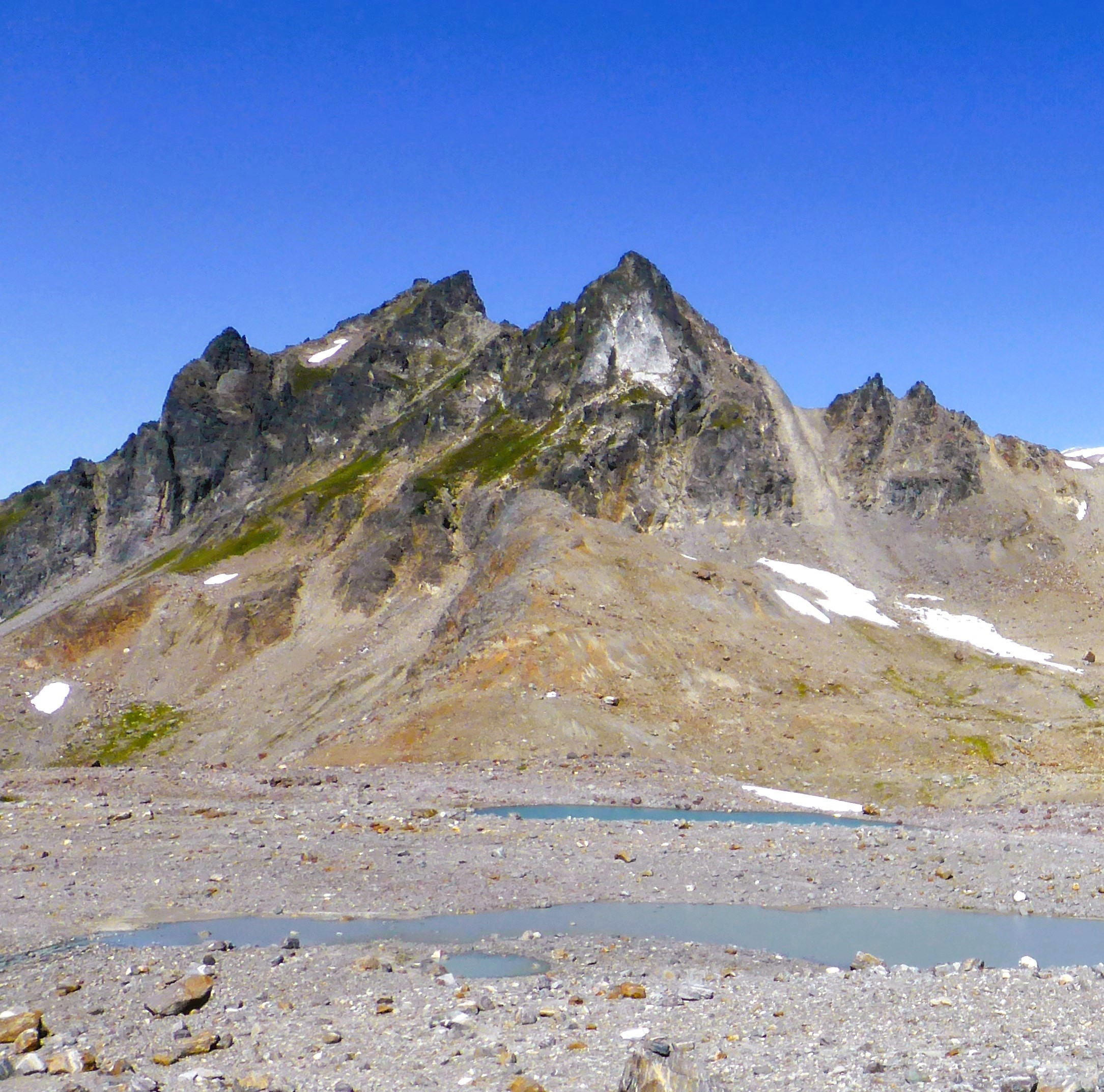
South aspect

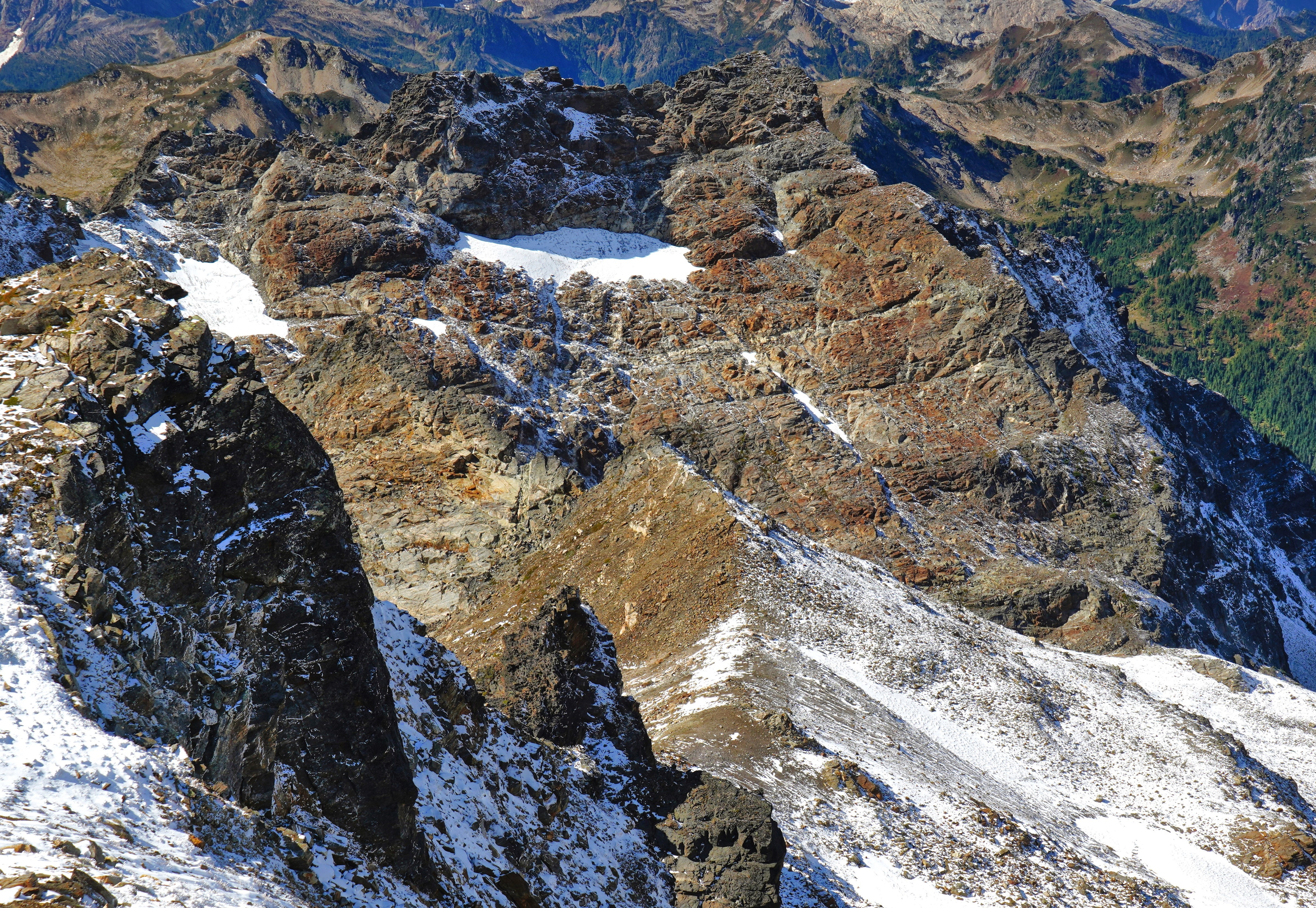
East aspect of Baekos Peak viewed from Glacier Gap Peak

== See also ==
- List of mountain peaks of Washington (state)
- Geography of the North Cascades
