= White Mountain (Washington) =

Mountain in Washington (state), United States

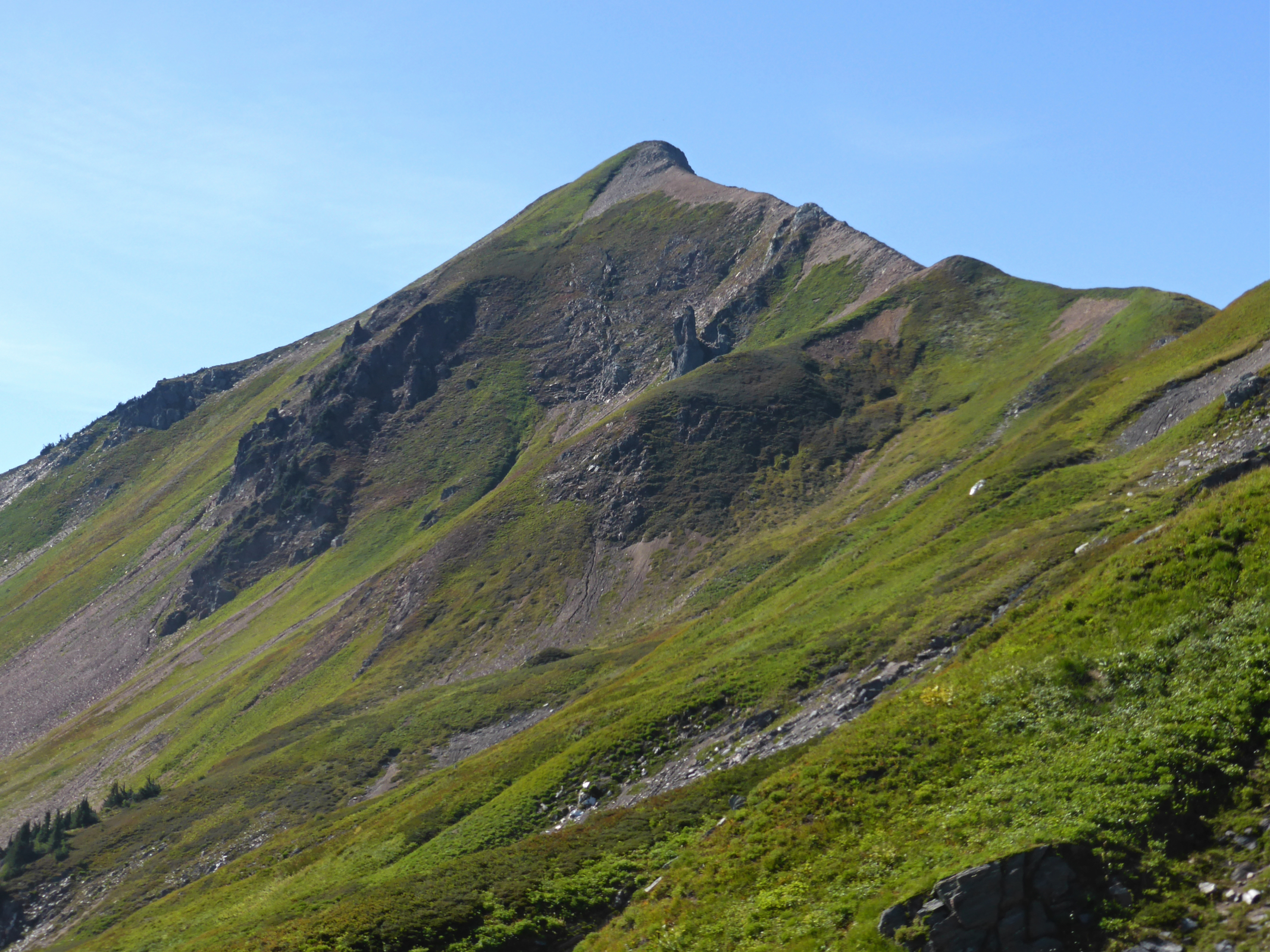
- White Mountain

Highest point
- Elevation: 7,043 ft (2,147 m)
- Prominence: 523 ft (159 m)
- Parent peak: Kololo Peaks (8,220 ft)
- Isolation: 2.64 mi (4.25 km)
- Coordinates: 48°02′27″N 121°09′10″W

Geography
- Location within Washington (state) Location within the United States
- Interactive map of White Mountain
- Country: United States
- State: Washington
- County: Snohomish / Chelan
- Protected area: Glacier Peak Wilderness
- Parent range: Cascade Range
- Topo map: USGS Glacier Peak West

Climbing
- Easiest route: Hiking

White Mountain is a 7,043-foot (2,147-metre) mountain located in the Glacier Peak Wilderness of the North Cascades in Washington state. The mountain is situated on the crest of the Cascade Range, on the shared border of Snohomish County and Chelan County, and also straddling the boundary between Mount Baker-Snoqualmie National Forest and Wenatchee National Forest. White Mountain is located 3.04 mi (4.89 km) to the west-southwest of Kololo Peaks, and immediately north of White Pass. The Pacific Crest Trail traverses the south slope of the peak. Precipitation runoff from the peak drains into the White River, White Chuck River, and Sauk River. The mountain's name was suggested by The Mountaineers, and officially adopted in 1918 by the United States Board on Geographic Names.

== Geology ==
The North Cascades feature some of the most rugged topography in the Cascade Range with craggy peaks, spires, ridges, and deep glacial valleys. Geological events occurring many years ago created the diverse topography and drastic elevation changes over the Cascade Range leading to the various climate differences.

The history of the formation of the Cascade Mountains dates back millions of years ago to the late Eocene Epoch. With the North American Plate overriding the Pacific Plate, episodes of volcanic igneous activity persisted. Glacier Peak, a stratovolcano that is 5.22 mi (8.40 km) north-northeast of White Mountain, began forming in the mid-Pleistocene. Due to Glacier Peak's proximity to White Mountain, volcanic ash is common in the area and provides fertile soil for an abundance of wildflowers.

During the Pleistocene period dating back over two million years ago, glaciation advancing and retreating repeatedly scoured the landscape leaving deposits of rock debris. The U-shaped cross section of the river valleys is a result of recent glaciation. Uplift and faulting in combination with glaciation have been the dominant processes which have created the tall peaks and deep valleys of the North Cascades area.

== Climate ==
White Mountain is located in the marine west coast climate zone of western North America. Most weather fronts originating in the Pacific Ocean travel northeast toward the Cascade Mountains. As fronts approach the North Cascades, they are forced upward by the peaks of the Cascade Range (orographic lift), causing them to drop their moisture in the form of rain or snowfall onto the Cascades. As a result, the west side of the North Cascades experiences high precipitation, especially during the winter months in the form of snowfall. Because of maritime influence, snow tends to be wet and heavy, resulting in high avalanche danger. During winter months, weather is usually cloudy, but due to high pressure systems over the Pacific Ocean that intensify during summer months, there is often little or no cloud cover during the summer. Due to its temperate climate and proximity to the Pacific Ocean, areas west of the Cascade Crest very rarely experience temperatures below 0 °F (−18 °C) or above 80 °F (27 °C).

== Gallery ==
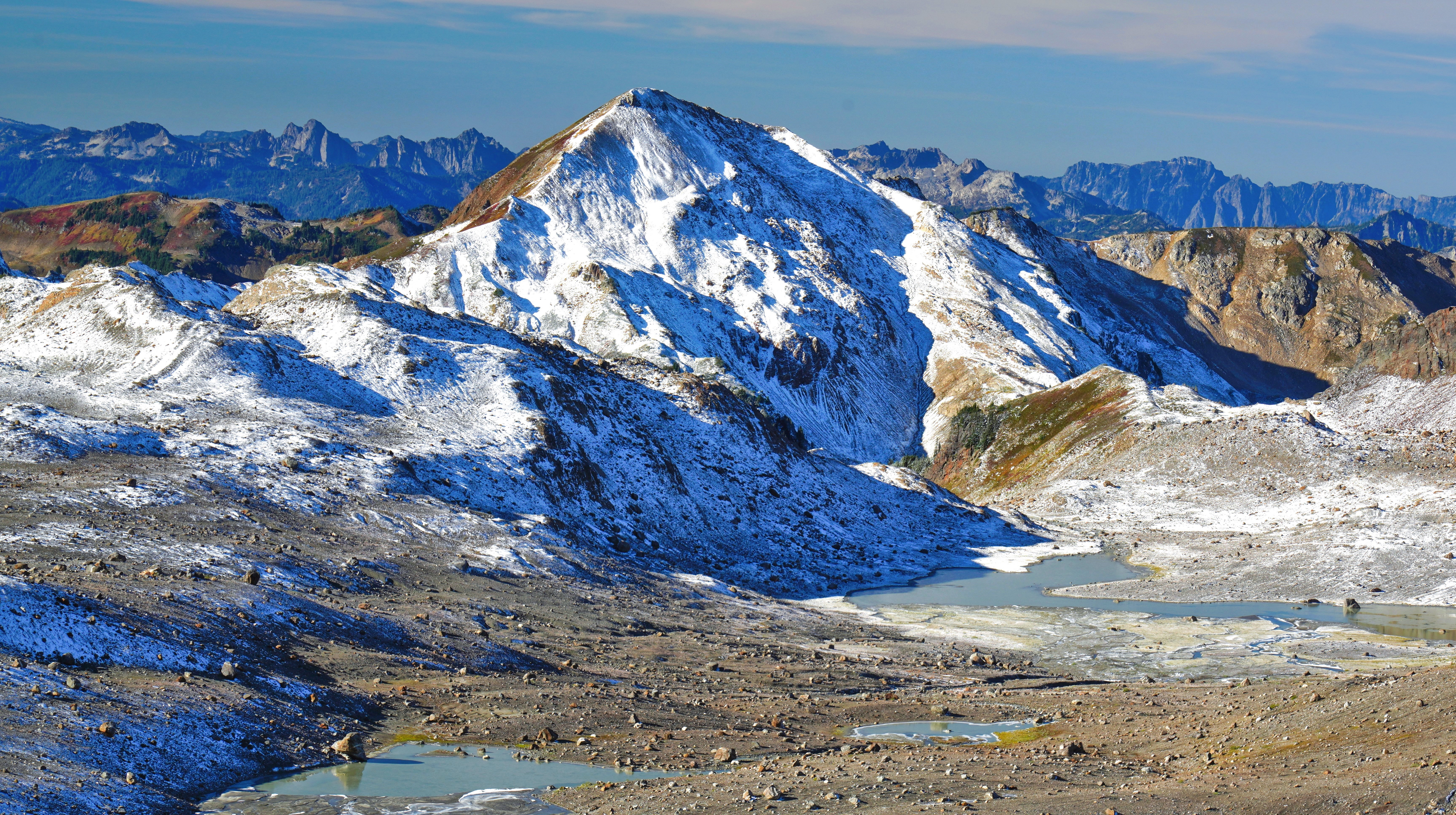
Northeast aspect

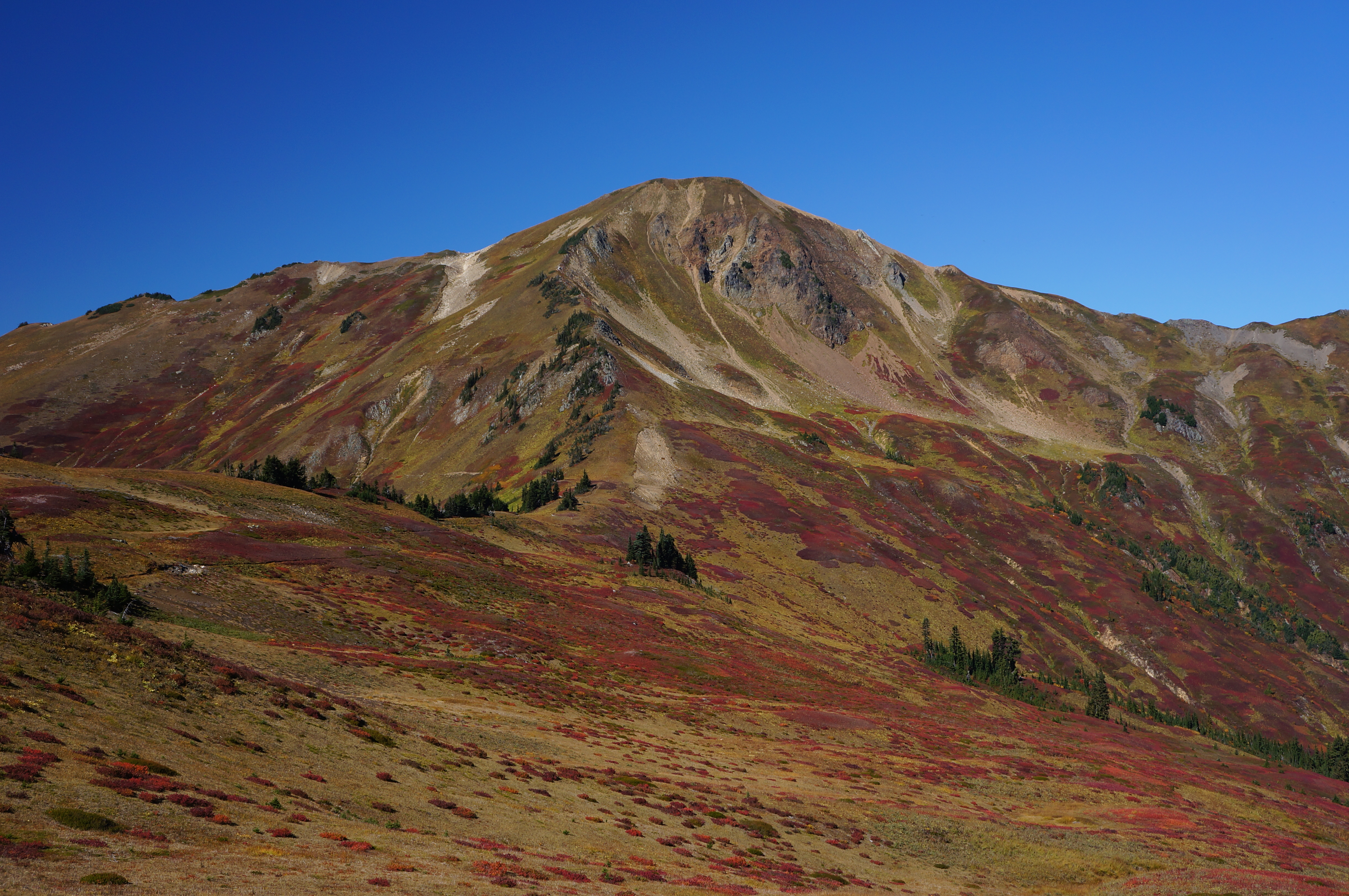
White Mountain

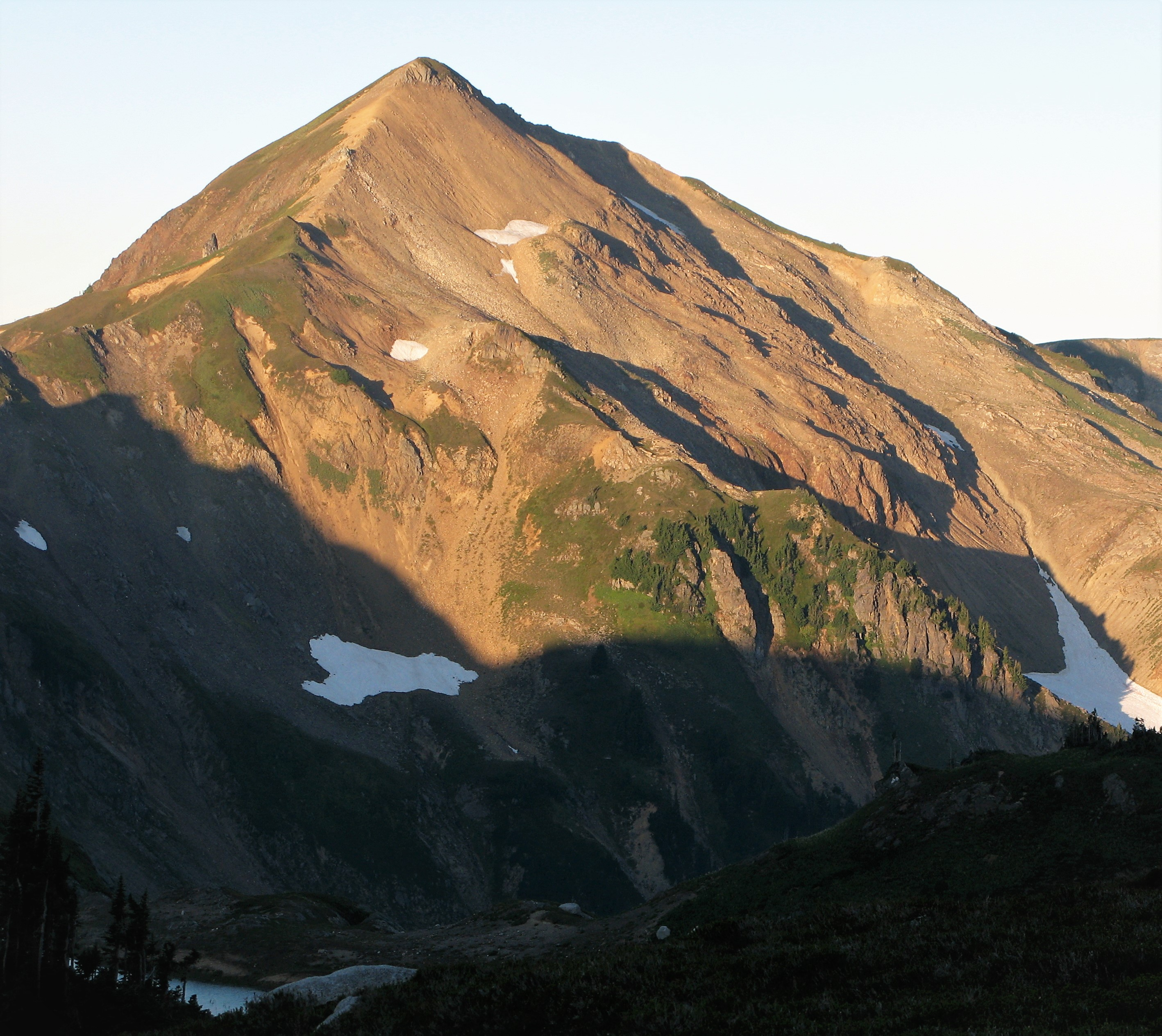

== See also ==
- List of mountain peaks of Washington (state)
- Geography of the North Cascades
