= Sloan Creek (Washington) =

River in Washington state, USA

- Location of the mouth of Sloan Creek in Washington Sloan Creek (Washington) (the United States)

Location
- Country: United States
- State: Washington
- County: Snohomish

Physical characteristics
- Source: Blue Lake
  - location: North Cascades, Washington
  - coordinates: 47°59′19″N 121°10′19″W
  - elevation: 5,629 ft (1,716 m)
- Mouth: North Fork Sauk River
  - location: 2.1 miles above the mouth of Lost Creek, Washington
  - coordinates: 48°3′29″N 121°17′26″W
  - elevation: 2,044 ft (623 m)

Sloan Creek is the largest tributary of the North Fork Sauk River, entering the river about 2.1 miles (3.4 km) above the mouth of Lost Creek. Its only major tributary is Cadet Creek, which enters the creek about 1.8 miles (2.9 km) above its mouth. According to Fred Beckey, Cadet Creek is larger than Sloan Creek and could be equally considered the head of the Sauk River as the North Fork itself.

== Course ==
Sloan Creek begins at the outlet of Blue Lake, which is located a slight 0.4 miles west of the unnamed lake that is the source of the North Fork Sauk River. Sloan Creek, after exiting Blue Lake, soon enters Little Blue Lake, which is located at an elevation of 5,185 feet (1,580 m). The creek exits Little Blue Lake and flows northwest for about 5.9 miles (9.5 km) until it turns north at its confluence with Cadet Creek. It picks up the waters of Bowser Creek about 2.3 miles above the mouth of Cadet Creek. From the mouth of Cadet Creek, the creek flows north for about 1.9 miles to its mouth. Sloan Creek shares its name with a mountain to the west, Sloan Peak.

== See also ==
- List of rivers in Washington
