= White Chuck Cinder Cone =

Cinder cone in Washington, United States

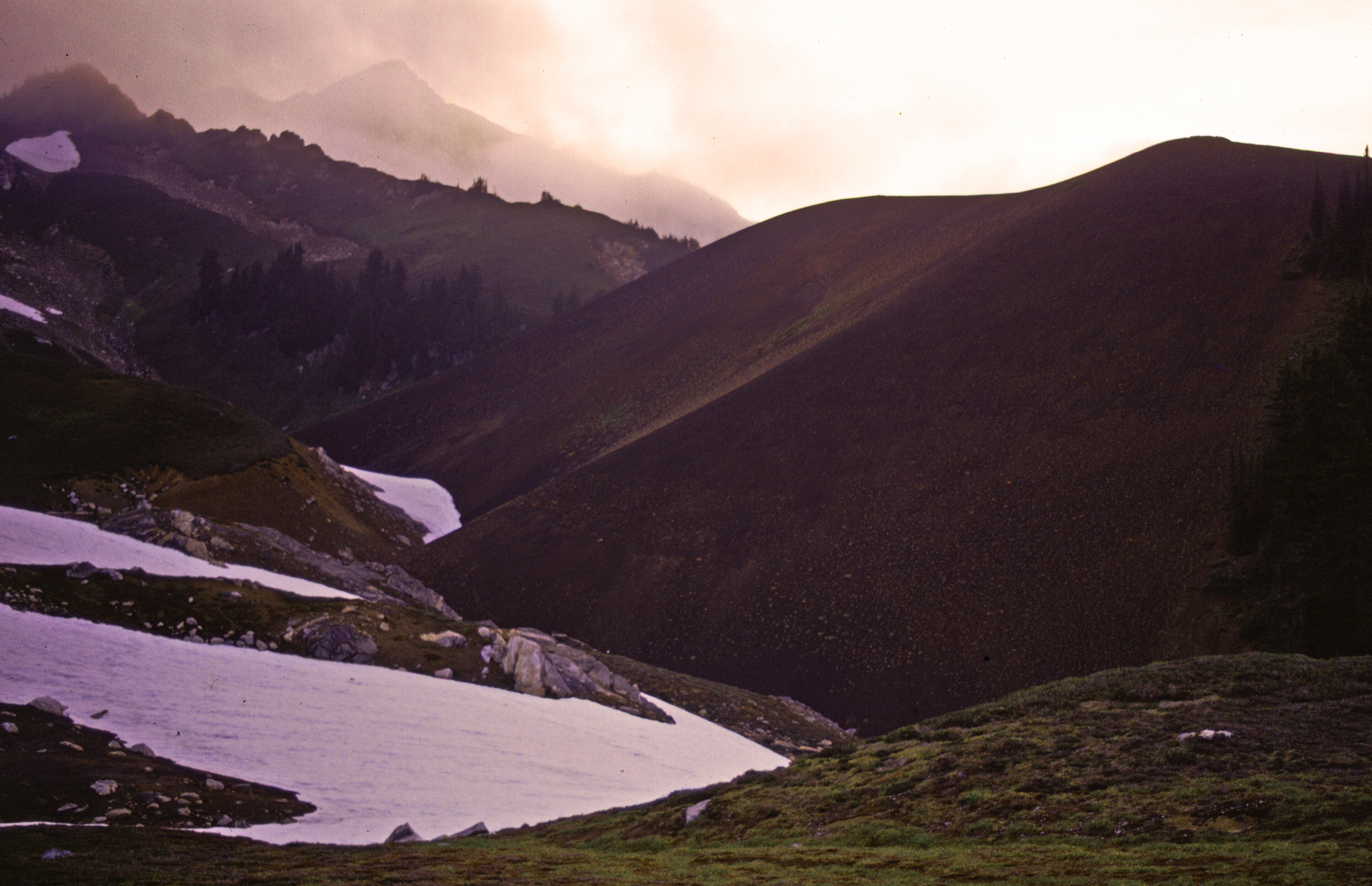

Highest point
- Elevation: 6,020 ft (1,835 m)
- Parent peak: Portal Peak (6,999 ft)
- Isolation: 0.64 mi (1.03 km)
- Coordinates: 48°3′11″N 121°10′2″W

Geography
- Location within Washington (state) Location within the United States
- Country: United States
- State: Washington
- County: Snohomish
- Protected area: Glacier Peak Wilderness
- Parent range: Cascade Range
- Topo map: USGS Glacier Peak West

Geology
- Mountain type: Cinder cone

White Chuck Cinder Cone is a cinder cone near Glacier Peak in Snohomish County of Washington, USA. Located near the headwaters of the White Chuck River, its existence was first reported by Everett Houghland in 1934. Its elevation is 6,020 ft (1,835 m).

Based on the amount of glacial erosion on the cinder cone, it is probably between 2,000 and 17,000 years old.

== Geology ==
The North Cascades feature some of the most rugged topography in the Cascade Range with craggy peaks, spires, ridges, and deep glacial valleys. Geological events occurring many years ago created the diverse topography and drastic elevation changes over the Cascade Range leading to the various climate differences.

The history of the formation of the Cascade Mountains dates back millions of years ago to the late Eocene Epoch. With the North American Plate overriding the Pacific Plate, episodes of volcanic igneous activity persisted. Glacier Peak, a stratovolcano that is 4.35 mi (7.00 km) north-northeast of White Chuck Cinder Cone, began forming in the mid-Pleistocene.

During the Pleistocene period dating back over two million years ago, glaciation advancing and retreating repeatedly scoured the landscape leaving deposits of rock debris. The U-shaped cross section of the river valleys is a result of recent glaciation. Uplift and faulting in combination with glaciation have been the dominant processes which have created the tall peaks and deep valleys of the North Cascades area.

== Climate ==
White Chuck Cinder Cone is located in the marine west coast climate zone of western North America. Most weather fronts originating in the Pacific Ocean travel northeast toward the Cascade Mountains. As fronts approach the North Cascades, they are forced upward by the peaks of the Cascade Range (orographic lift), causing them to drop their moisture in the form of rain or snowfall onto the Cascades. As a result, the west side of the North Cascades experiences high precipitation, especially during the winter months in the form of snowfall. Because of maritime influence, snow tends to be wet and heavy, resulting in high avalanche danger. During winter months, weather is usually cloudy, but due to high pressure systems over the Pacific Ocean that intensify during summer months, there is often little or no cloud cover during the summer. Due to its temperate climate and proximity to the Pacific Ocean, areas west of the Cascade Crest very rarely experience temperatures below 0 °F (−18 °C) or above 80 °F (27 °C).

== See also ==
- Geography of the North Cascades

== Gallery ==
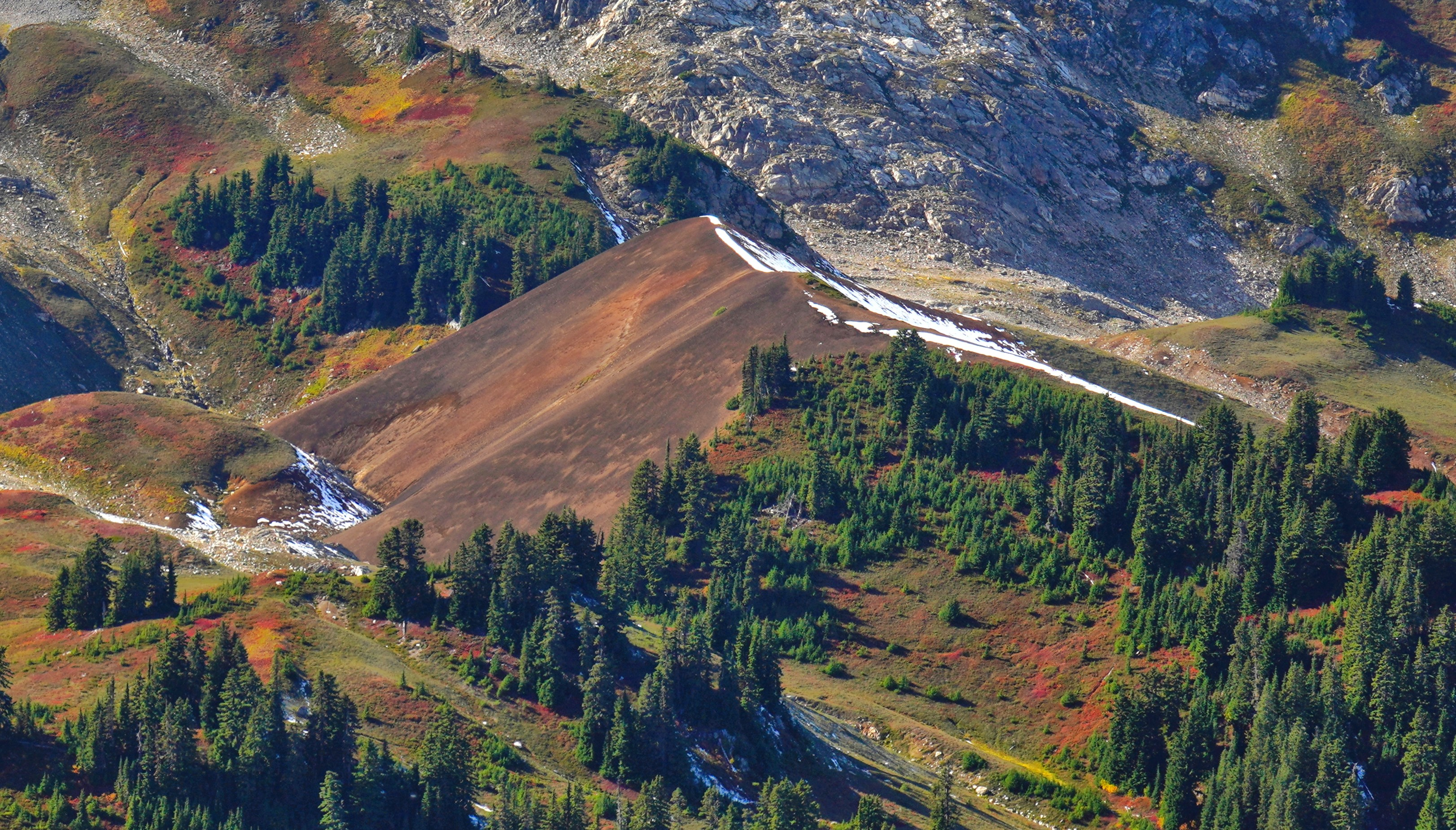
White Chuck Cinder Cone centered

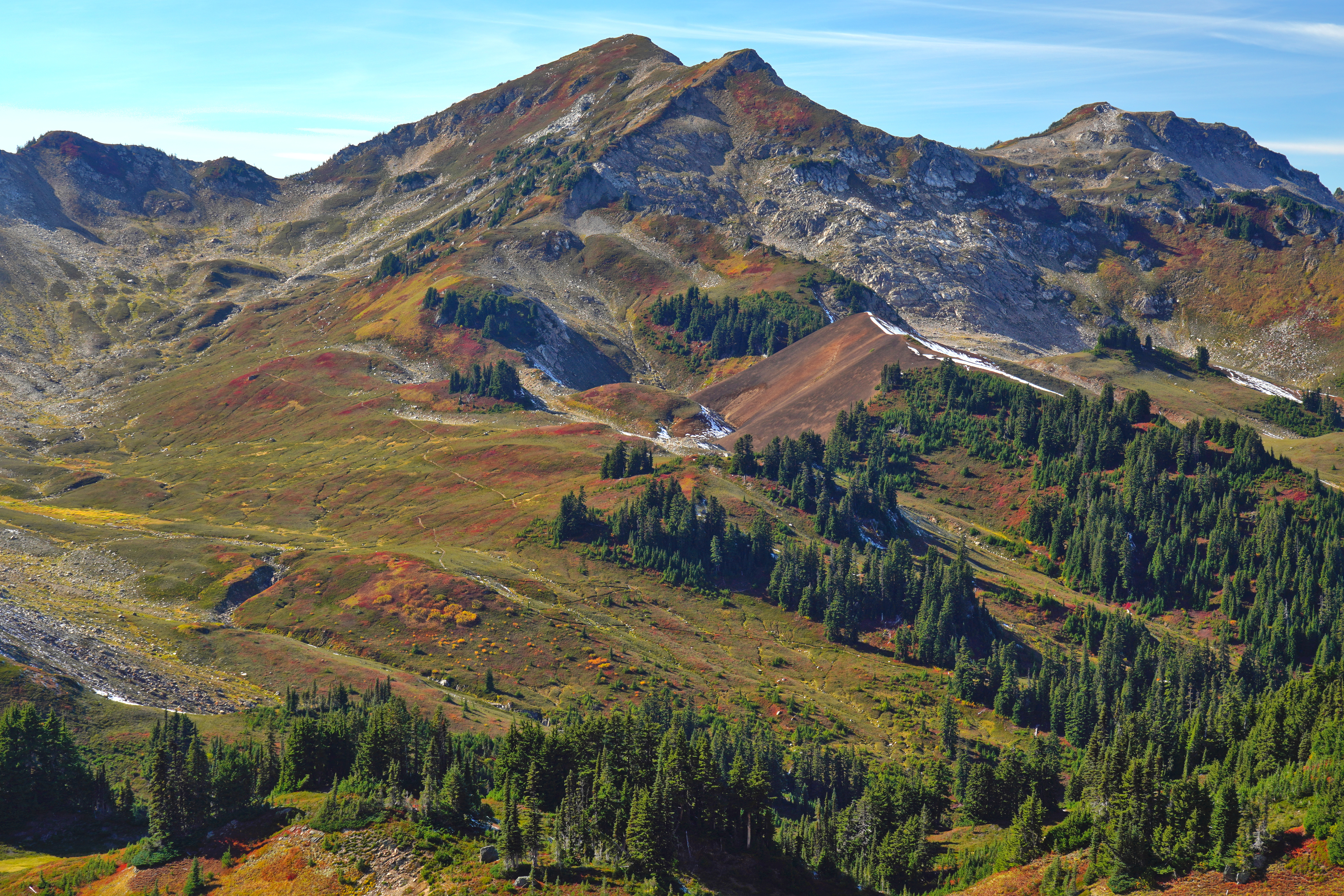
White Chuck Cinder Cone below Portal Peak, viewed from the east.
