= Bedal Peak =

Mountain in Washington (state), United States

- South aspect

Highest point
- Elevation: 6,554 ft (1,998 m)
- Prominence: 1,224 ft (373 m)
- Parent peak: Sloan Peak (7,835 ft)
- Isolation: 1.98 mi (3.19 km)
- Coordinates: 48°04′08″N 121°21′15″W

Geography
- Location within Washington (state) Location within the United States
- Interactive map of Bedal Peak
- Country: United States
- State: Washington
- County: Snohomish
- Protected area: Henry M. Jackson Wilderness
- Parent range: Cascade Range; North Cascades
- Topo map: USGS Sloan Peak

Geology
- Rock type: Orthogneiss

Climbing
- First ascent: 1921
- Easiest route: class 2 scrambling

Bedal Peak is a 6,554-foot-elevation (1,998-meter) mountain summit located in the North Cascades, in Snohomish County of Washington state. The mountain is situated in the Henry M. Jackson Wilderness, on land managed by the Mount Baker-Snoqualmie National Forest. The nearest higher neighbor is the line parent Sloan Peak, 2 mi (3.2 km) to the south-southeast. Precipitation runoff from the peak drains west to the South Fork Sauk River via Bedal Creek, as well as north and east into tributaries of the North Fork. The north and south forks merge at the northwest base of the mountain to form the Sauk River. Topographic relief is significant as the summit rises 5,250 feet (1,600 meters) above the Sauk River Valley and Mountain Loop Highway in approximately two miles.

== History ==
This geographical feature's toponym has been officially adopted by the U.S. Board on Geographic Names to remember James Bedal (1862–1932), who settled at the base of the peak with his wife Susie in 1892. He worked for the National Forest Service. The first ascent of the summit was made circa 1921 by Harry Bedal who was the son of James. Harry is also credited with the first ascents of Sloan Peak and Three Fingers.

== Climate ==
Bedal Peak is located in the marine west coast climate zone of western North America. Most weather fronts coming off the Pacific Ocean travel east toward the Cascade Mountains. As fronts approach the North Cascades, they are forced upward by the peaks of the Cascade Range, causing them to drop their moisture in the form of rain or snowfall onto the Cascades (orographic lift). As a result, the west side of the North Cascades experiences high precipitation, especially during the winter months in the form of snowfall. Because of maritime influence, snow tends to be wet and heavy, resulting in avalanche danger. During winter months, weather is usually cloudy, but due to high pressure systems over the Pacific Ocean that intensify during summer months, there is often little or no cloud cover during the summer. Due to its temperate climate and proximity to the Pacific Ocean, areas west of the Cascade Crest very rarely experience temperatures below 0 °F (−18 °C) or above 80 °F (27 °C).

== Geology ==
The North Cascades feature some of the most rugged topography in the Cascade Range with craggy peaks, spires, ridges, and deep glacial valleys. Geological events occurring many years ago created the diverse topography and drastic elevation changes over the Cascade Range leading to the various climate differences.

The history of the formation of the Cascade Mountains dates back millions of years ago to the late Eocene Epoch. With the North American Plate overriding the Pacific Plate, episodes of volcanic igneous activity persisted. Glacier Peak, a stratovolcano that is 11.5 mi (18.5 km) east-northeast of Bedal Peak, began forming in the mid-Pleistocene. In addition, small fragments of the oceanic and continental lithosphere called terranes created the North Cascades about 50 million years ago.

During the Pleistocene period dating back over two million years ago, glaciation advancing and retreating repeatedly scoured the landscape leaving deposits of rock debris. The U-shaped cross section of the river valleys is a result of recent glaciation. Uplift and faulting in combination with glaciation have been the dominant processes which have created the tall peaks and deep valleys of the North Cascades area.

== Gallery ==
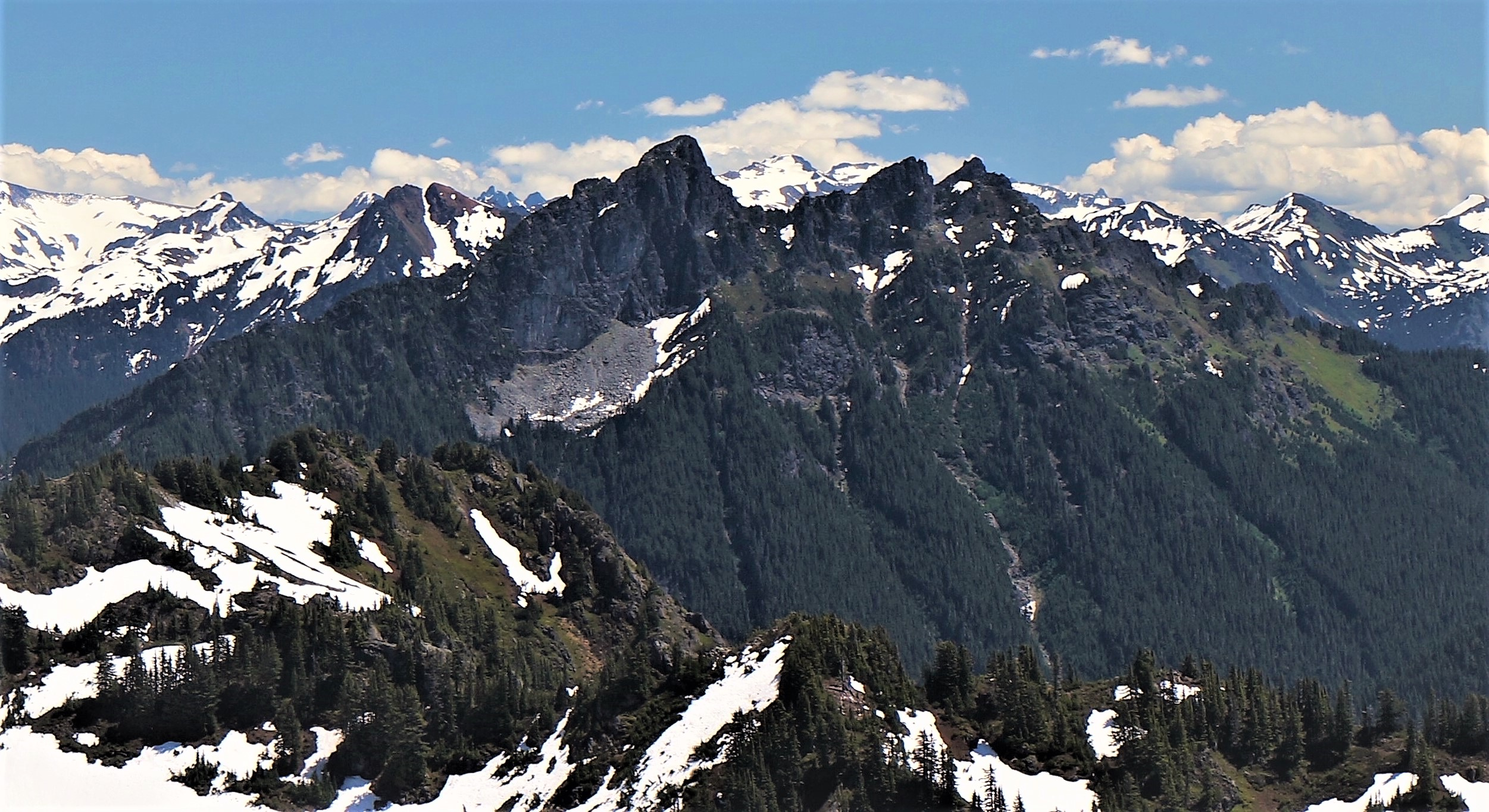
Bedal Peak (centered) seen from Mt Dickerman.

Bedal Peak seen from Sloan Peak

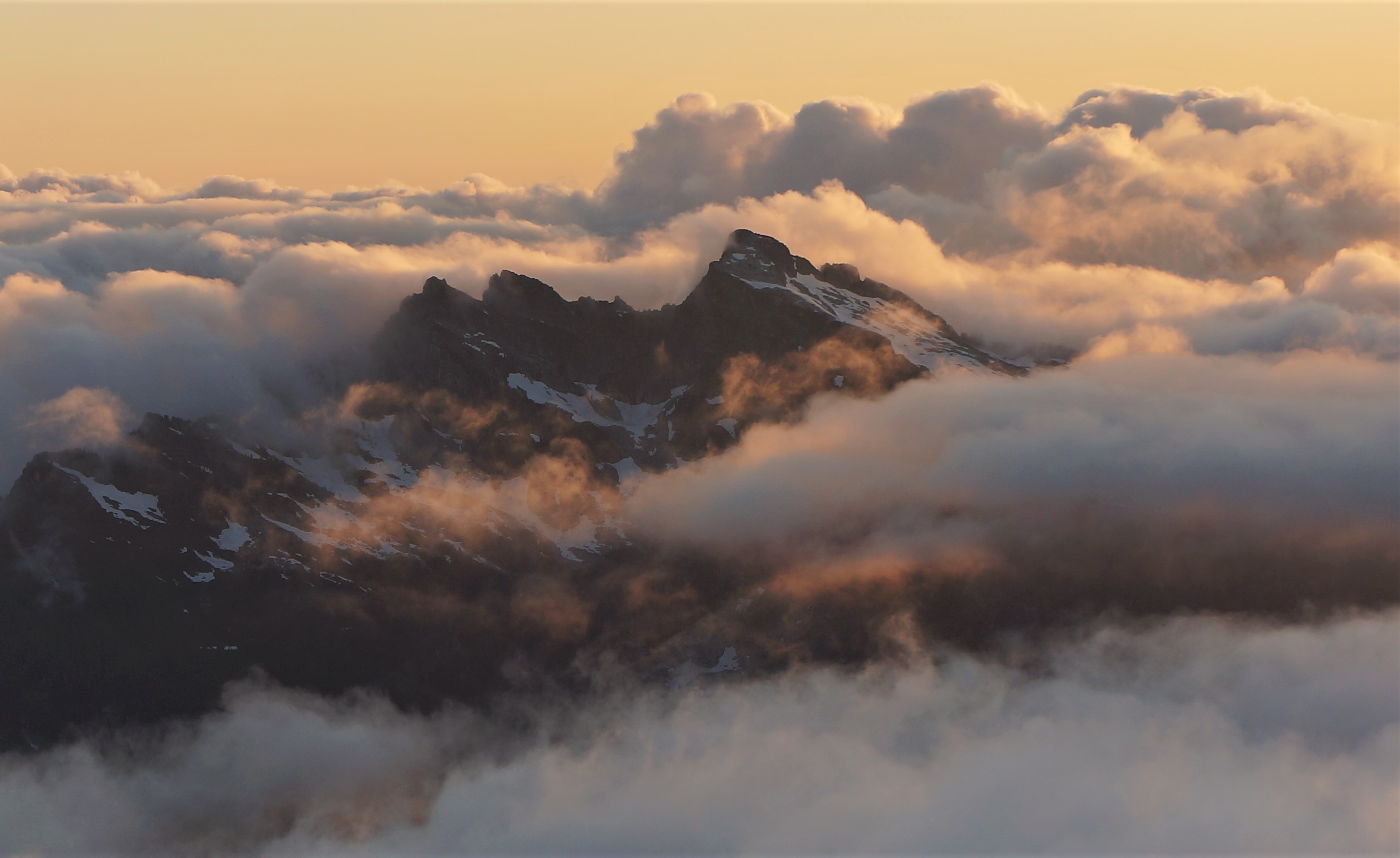
East aspect of Bedal Peak seen from Painted Mountain

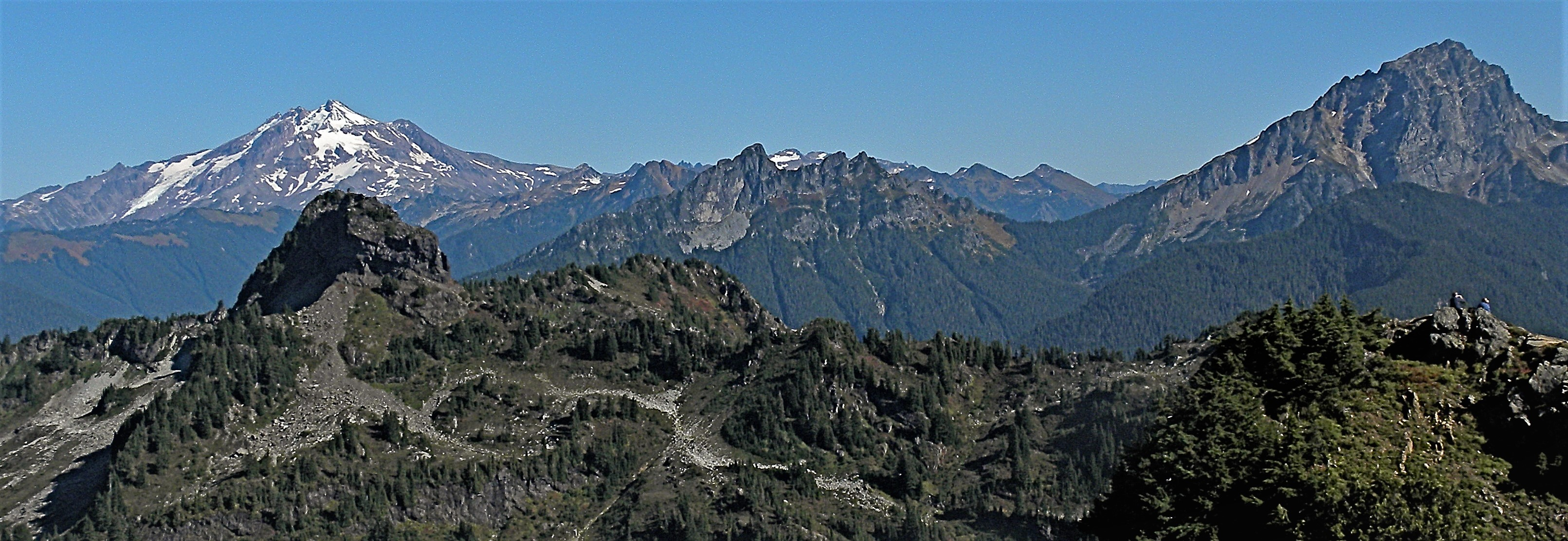
Glacier Peak (left), Bedal Peak (centered), and Sloan Peak (right) seen from the summit of Mt Dickerman.

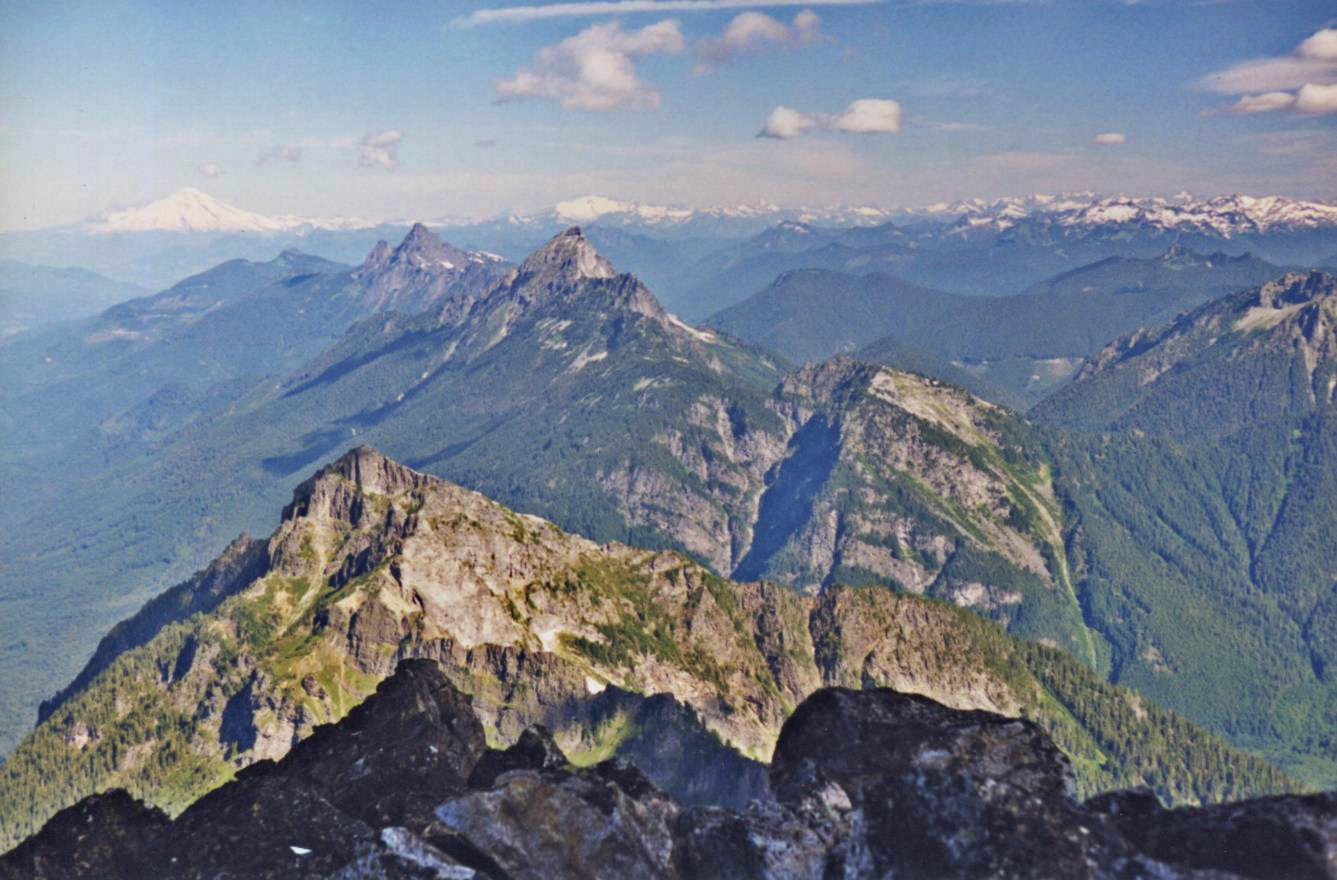
View from summit of Sloan Peak with Bedal Peak lower left of center

== See also ==
- Geography of the North Cascades
