= Sloan Peak =

Mountain in Washington (state), United States

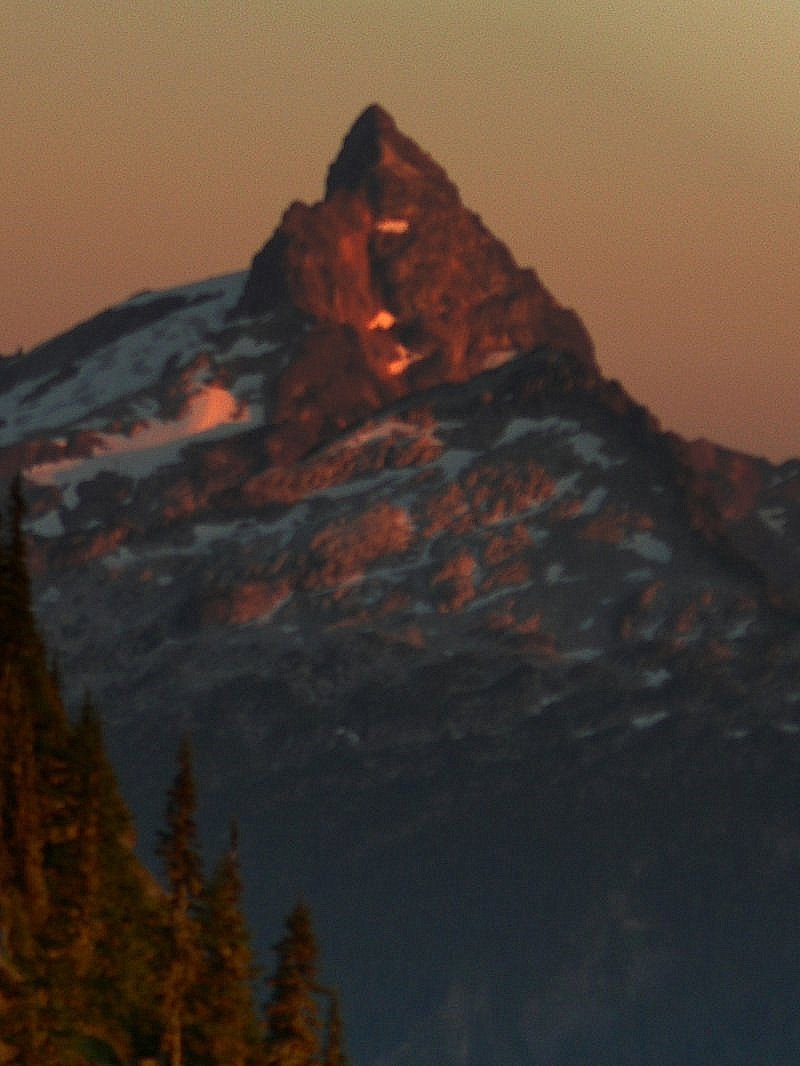
- Sloan Peak at sunset, taken from Mount Pugh

Highest point
- Elevation: 7,835 ft (2,388 m)
- Prominence: 3,875 ft (1,181 m)
- Coordinates: 48°02′29″N 121°20′25″W

Geography
- Location within Washington (state) Location within the United States
- Interactive map of Sloan Peak
- Location: Snohomish County, Washington, U.S.
- Parent range: North Cascades
- Topo map: USGS Sloan Peak

Climbing
- First ascent: July 30, 1921 by Harry Bedal, Nels Skaar
- Easiest route: Snow climb/rock scramble, class 3

Sloan Peak is a 7,835-foot (2,388-metre) mountain in the North Cascades of Washington state. It rises about 40 miles (64 km) east of Everett, Washington and 12 miles southwest of Glacier Peak, one of the Cascade stratovolcanoes. It is located between the north and south forks of Sauk River, in the Mount Baker–Snoqualmie National Forest. The summit is situated about 4 miles (6.4 km) east of the Mountain Loop Highway.

Sloan Peak has been called the "Matterhorn of the Cascades" for its sharp, high peak, which is accentuated by its impressive local relief and its isolated position west of the Cascade crest. It is easily visible from many locations in the North Cascades. On both the east and southwest sides, Sloan's summit rises more than one vertical mile (1.6 km) above the valley floor in less than two horizontal miles (3.2 km).

The standard route on the peak climbs the South Face and Upper West Face, but it is also known as the "Corkscrew Route" due to its winding nature. It starts on the north side of the peak, and traverses the Sloan Glacier to reach the east edge of the South Face; the route then continues to turn around the peak to reach the summit via the Upper West Face. It involves snow and glacier climbing and some rock scrambling (class 3). Other more technical routes exist on Sloan's other faces.

== History ==
Sloan Peak was first climbed by Harry Bedal and Nels Skaar on July 30, 1921, via the Corkscrew Route.

== Climate ==
Sloan Peak is located in the marine west coast climate zone of western North America. Most weather fronts originate in the Pacific Ocean, and travel northeast toward the Cascade Mountains. As fronts approach the North Cascades, they are forced upward by the peaks of the Cascade Range, causing them to drop their moisture in the form of rain or snowfall onto the Cascades (Orographic lift). As a result, the west side of the North Cascades experiences high precipitation, especially during the winter months in the form of snowfall. During winter months, weather is usually cloudy, but, due to high pressure systems over the Pacific Ocean that intensify during summer months, there is often little or no cloud cover during the summer. Because of maritime influence, snow tends to be wet and heavy, resulting in high avalanche danger.

== Geology ==
The North Cascades features some of the most rugged topography in the Cascade Range with craggy peaks, spires, ridges, and deep glacial valleys. Geological events occurring many years ago created the diverse topography and drastic elevation changes over the Cascade Range leading to the various climate differences.

The history of the formation of the Cascade Mountains dates back millions of years ago to the late Eocene Epoch. With the North American Plate overriding the Pacific Plate, episodes of volcanic igneous activity persisted. In addition, small fragments of the oceanic and continental lithosphere called terranes created the North Cascades about 50 million years ago.

During the Pleistocene period dating back over two million years ago, glaciation advancing and retreating repeatedly scoured the landscape leaving deposits of rock debris. The U-shaped cross section of the river valleys is a result of recent glaciation. Uplift and faulting in combination with glaciation have been the dominant processes which have created the tall peaks and deep valleys of the North Cascades area.

== Gallery ==
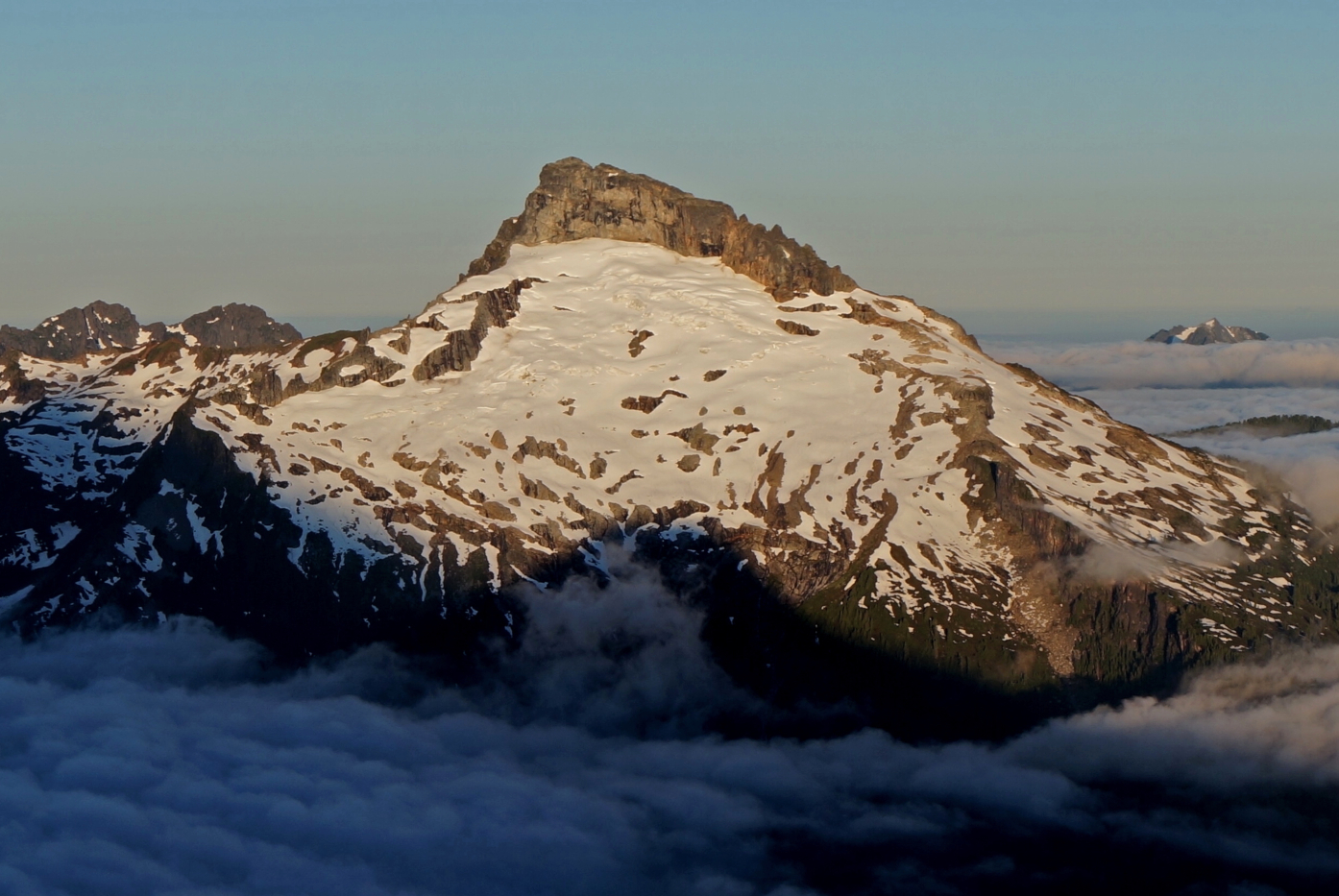
Sloan Peak from Painted Mountain

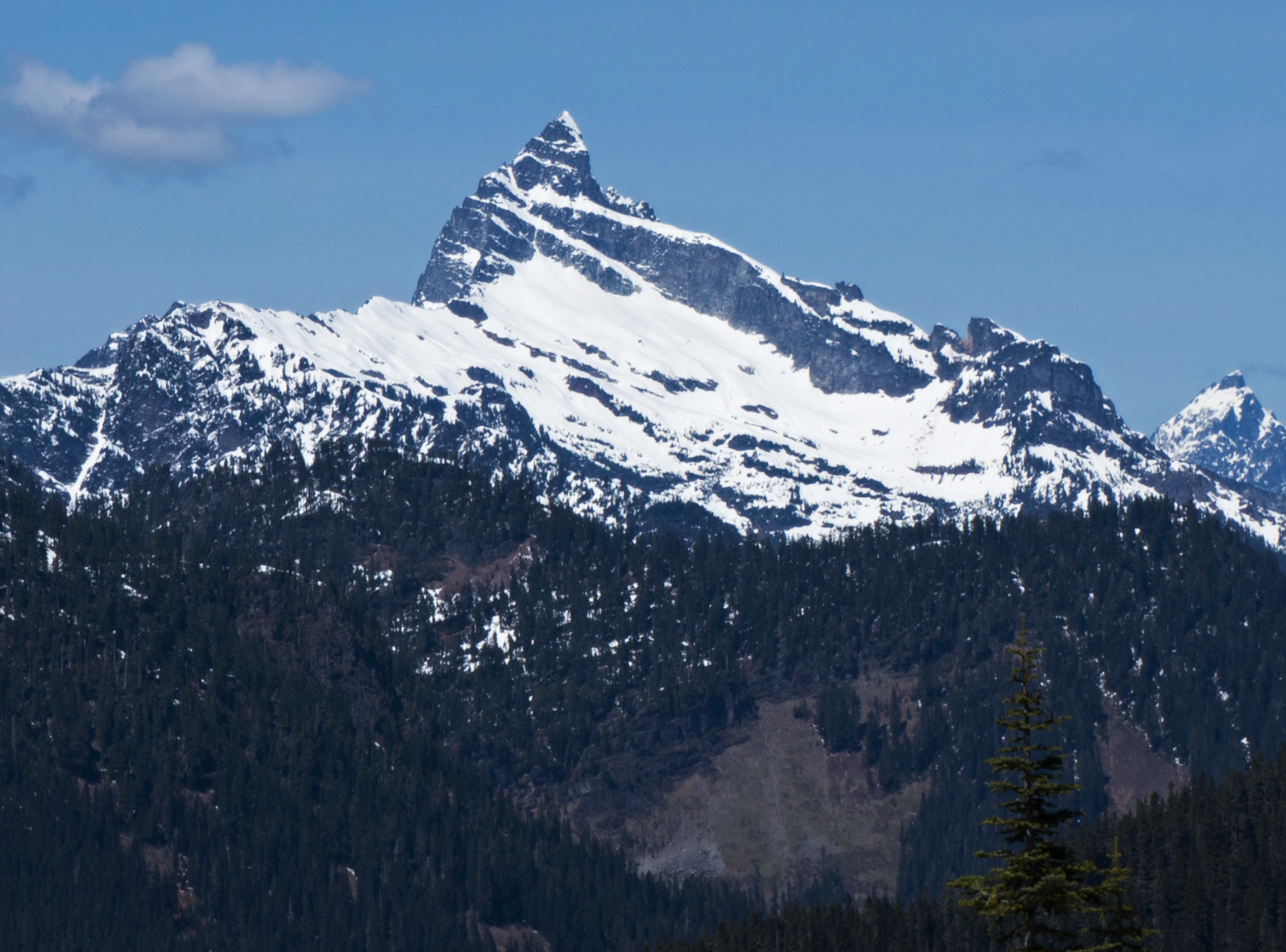
Sloan Peak from southeast

== See also ==
- Bedal Peak
- Geography of the North Cascades
