= Skagit peoples =

The Skagit peoples (/ˈskædʒɪt/ SKA-jit) may refer to:

- Lower Skagit, a historic Lushootseed-speaking tribe located around northern Whidbey Island in the US state of Washington
- Upper Skagit Indian Tribe, a federally recognized tribe in Skagit County, Washington
