= White Chuck River =

River in Washington, United States

- Location of the mouth of the White Chuck River in Washington White Chuck River (the United States)

Location
- Country: United States
- State: Washington
- Region: Snohomish County

Physical characteristics
- Source: Glacier Peak
  - location: Cascade Range
  - coordinates: 48°2′43″N 121°9′42″W
  - elevation: 5,788 ft (1,764 m)
- Mouth: Sauk River
  - coordinates: 48°10′22″N 121°28′20″W
  - elevation: 912 ft (278 m)
- Length: 23 mi (37 km)

The White Chuck River is a river in the U.S. state of Washington. It is a tributary of the Sauk River.

== Course ==
The White Chuck River originates on the slopes of Glacier Peak in the Cascade Range, near White Chuck Cinder Cone. It flows generally northwest to join the Sauk River south of Darrington. The Sauk River in turn joins the Skagit River, which empties into Skagit Bay, part of Puget Sound.

== See also ==
- List of rivers of Washington (state)
