= Sauk River (Washington) =

River in Washington

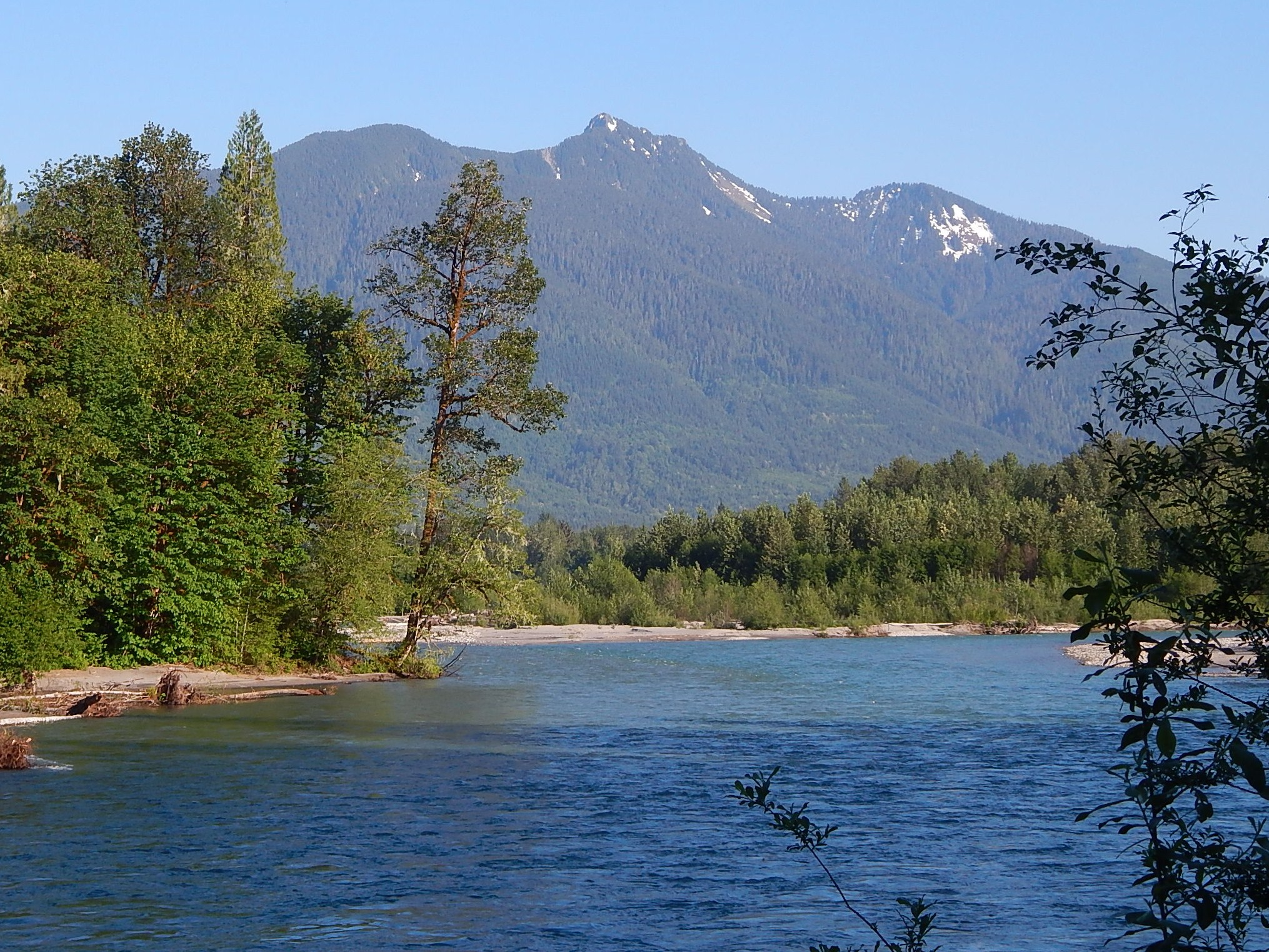
- The Sauk River along SR530, north of Darrington, Washington

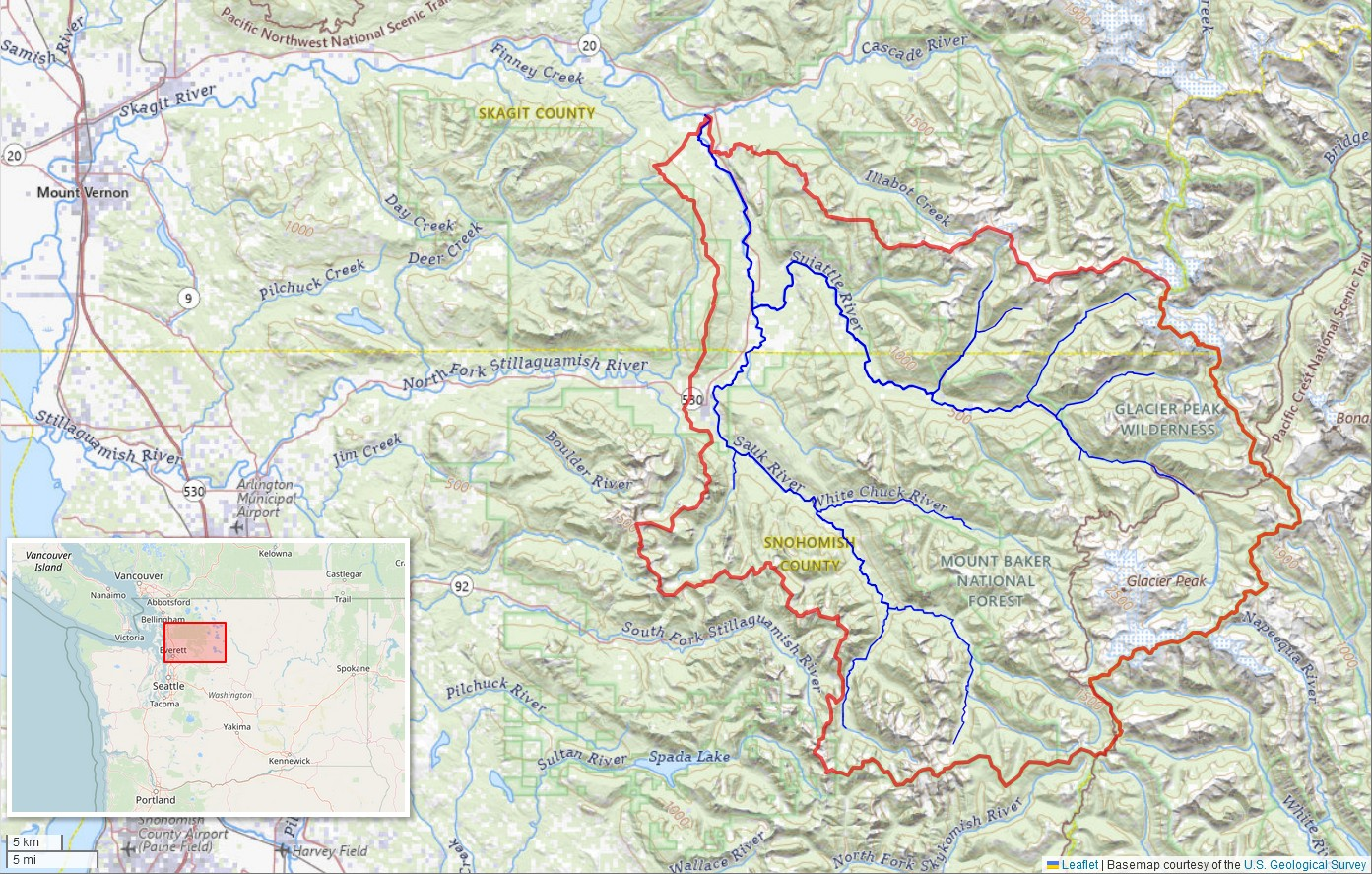
- Sauk River watershed (Interactive map)

Location
- Country: United States
- State: Washington
- County: Skagit, Snohomish

Physical characteristics
- Source: North Fork and South Fork confluence
  - location: Cascade Range
  - coordinates: 48°5′59″N 121°23′28″W
  - elevation: 1,204 ft (367 m)
- Mouth: Skagit River
  - coordinates: 48°28′53″N 121°37′12″W
  - elevation: 217 ft (66 m)
- Length: 45 mi (72 km)
- Basin size: 714 sq mi (1,850 km^{2})
- Discharge
  - location: USGS gage 12189500 near Sauk, WA
  - average: 4,332 cu ft/s (122.7 m^{3}/s)
  - minimum: 578 cu ft/s (16.4 m^{3}/s)
  - maximum: 69,900 cu ft/s (1,980 m^{3}/s)

National Wild and Scenic River
- Designated: November 10, 1978

The Sauk River is a tributary of the Skagit River, approximately 45 miles (72 km) long, in northwestern Washington in the United States. It drains an area of the high Cascade Range in the watershed of Puget Sound north of Seattle. The river is a popular destination for fly fishing. It is a National Wild and Scenic River.

Its two forks rise in the Cascades in eastern Snohomish County, in the Glacier Peak Wilderness and join to form the mainstem Sauk River at Bedal Peak. From there the river flows northwest from there through a remote section of the Mount Baker-Snoqualmie National Forest to Darrington, then north to join the Skagit River from the south at Rockport. The Sauk River receives the Suiattle River from the east approximately 12 miles (19 km) south of Rockport and the White Chuck River just above Darrington. Another important tributary is Clear Creek, which joins the Sauk just above Darrington.

At Darrington the Sauk River comes so close to the head of the North Fork Stillaguamish River that boats used to portage across the divide.

The name "Sauk" comes from the saʔqʷəbixʷ (the Sauk-Suiattle Tribe), a group related to the Skagit peoples, not from the Sauk people of the Midwestern U.S.

== South Fork ==
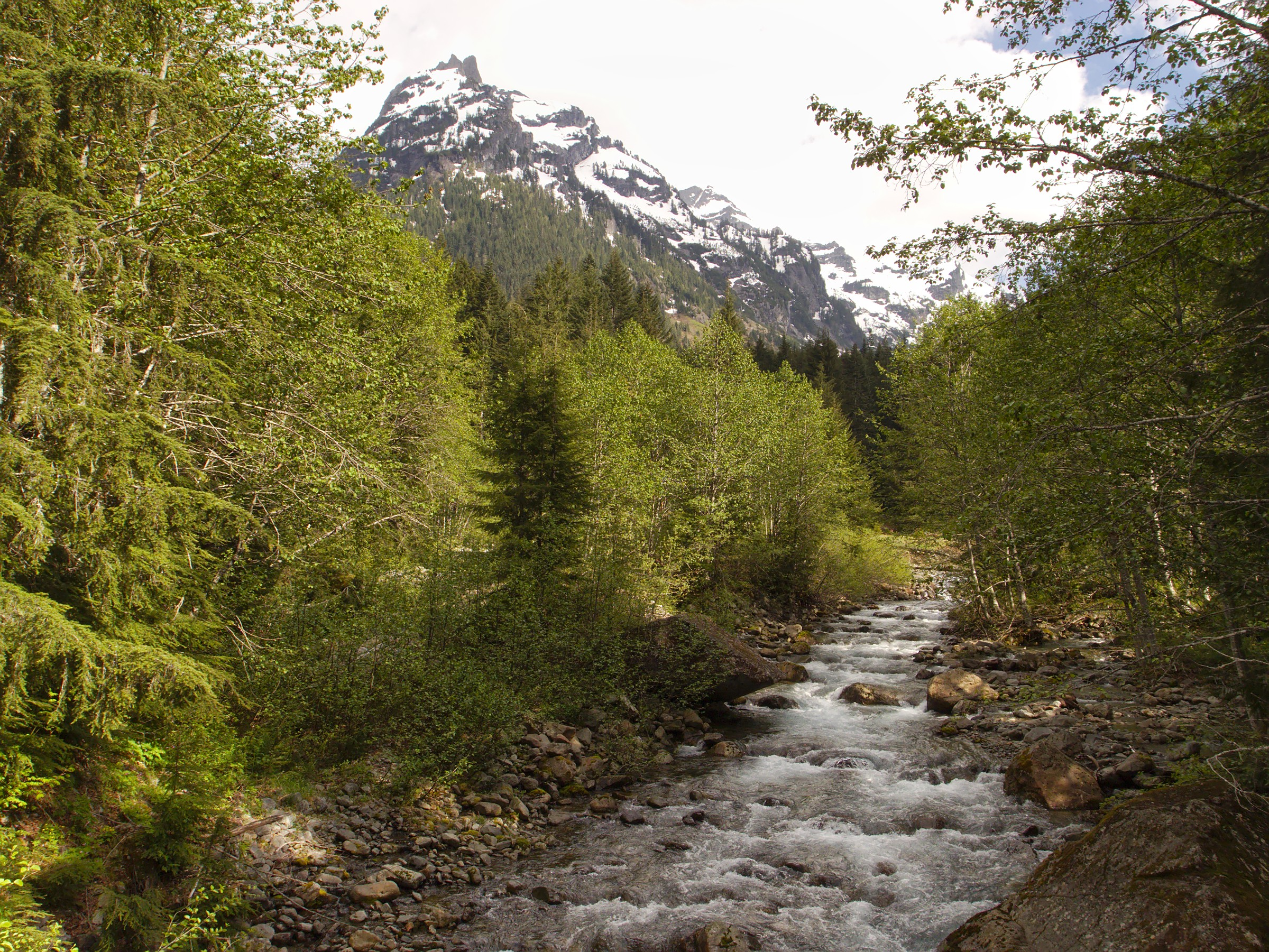
South Fork from entrance to Monte Cristo townsite

The South Fork Sauk River's headwaters flow from a glacier on the northwest side of Columbia Peak. The river flows generally northwest through Seventysix Gulch to Monte Cristo, where it is joined by Glacier Creek. The South Fork continues to flow northwest until it is joined by Weden Creek, where it turns north. It flows just east of Barlow Pass, after which it is paralleled by the Mountain Loop Highway. After several miles the river enters Monte Cristo Lake. A number of camping sites are located along the South Fork Sauk River north of Monte Cristo Lake. Near Bedal Campground the South Fork converges with the North Fork to form the mainstem Sauk River.

A remarkably short and low divide, Barlow Pass, separates the South Fork Sauk River from Palmer Creek, a headwater tributary of the South Fork Stillaguamish River. The unusual geography, orientation, and size of these rivers and their valleys suggests that during the Pleistocene era the Sauk River flowed west through Barlow Pass into what it now the Stillaguamish valley.

=== Tributaries ===
- Glacier Creek: Joins the South Fork at Monte Cristo.
- Weden Creek: Joins about 2.3 miles (3.7 km) downstream from Monte Cristo.
- Elliot Creek: Joins just downstream from the outlet of Monte Cristo Lake.

== North Fork ==
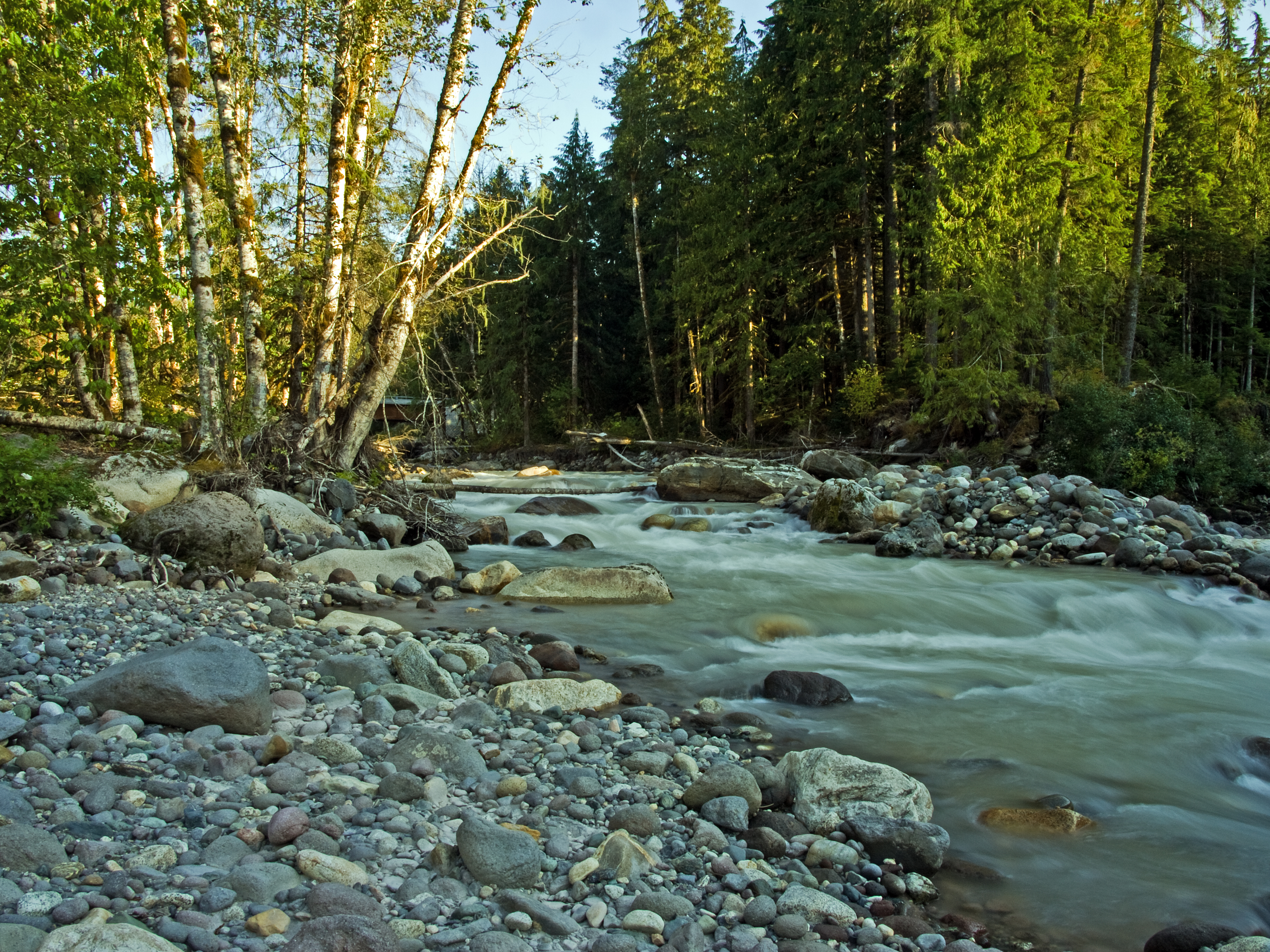
The North Fork of Sauk River

The North Fork, the larger of the two forks, starts at the outlet of a small, unnamed lake opposite to Blue Lake near Johnson Mountain. It flows generally northwest for most of its length. Near its confluence with the South Fork it then turns west and rushes through a gorge in which it drops over the North Fork Falls, a powerful plunge at least 58 feet (18 m) high. Shortly below it also drops over smaller Lower North Fork Falls. The North Fork converges with the South Fork near Bedal Campground, forming the mainstem Sauk River.

According to Fred Beckey the source of the North Fork could be equally considered to be its tributary Cadet Creek, which joins the North Fork via Sloan Creek.

=== Tributaries ===
- Sloan Creek: Joins the North Fork about 2.1 miles (3.4 km) above Lost Creek.
  - Cadet Creek: Flows from the northeast side of Monte Cristo Peak.
- Cougar Creek: Flows from Cougar Lake on the east side of Bedal Peak.
- Lost Creek: Joins about 3.5 miles (5.6 km) above the North Fork's mouth.

== History ==
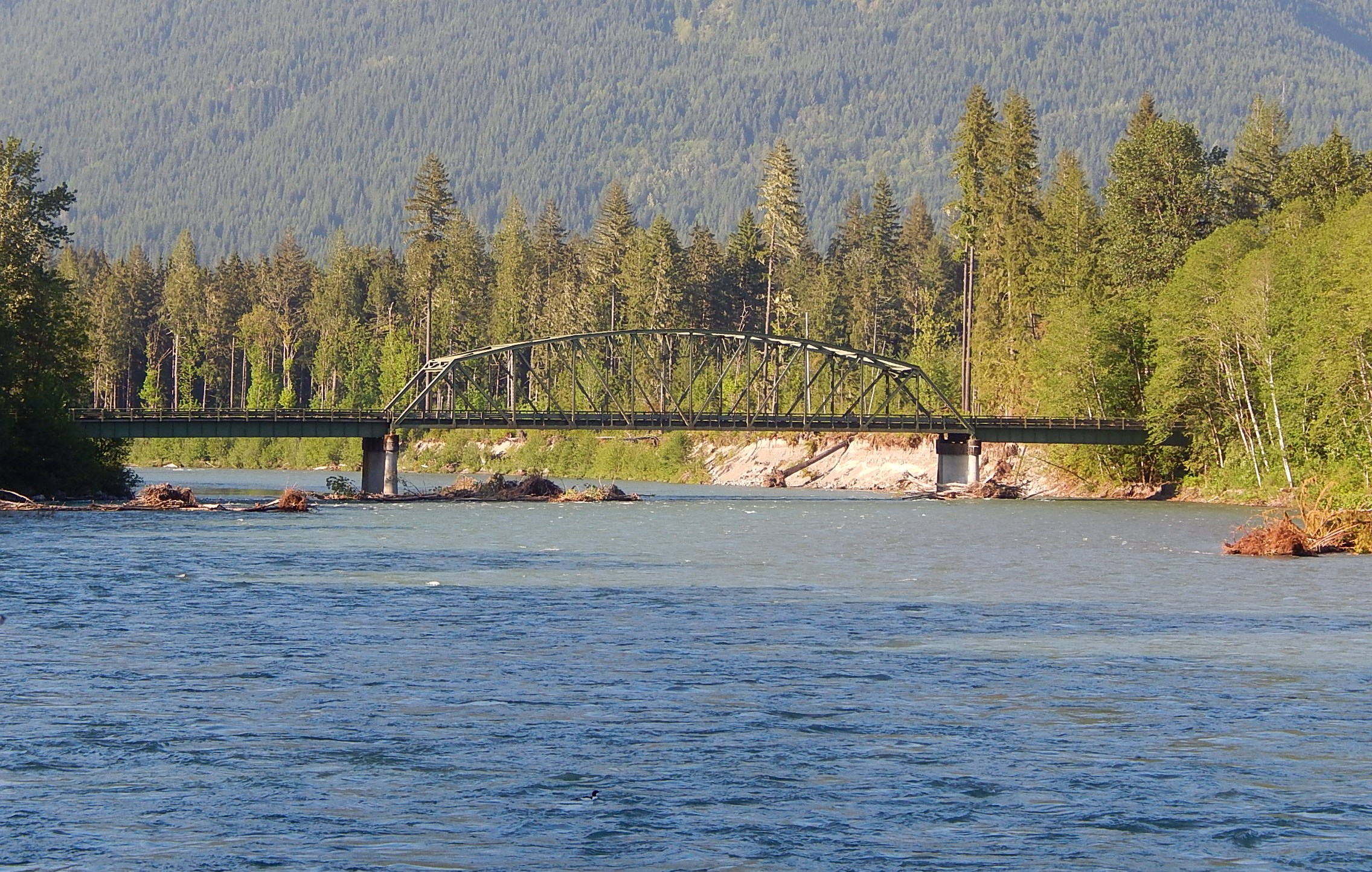
SR530 Sauk River Bridge

In 1890 prospectors exploring north from the Skykomish River basin made discoveries leading to the mining boom at Monte Cristo near the source of the North Fork Sauk River. The difficulty of access from the south led to the 1891 construction of a narrow wagon road along the Sauk River. The Sauk wagon road ran from Sauk City on the Skagit River to the mines at Monte Cristo. A key stop on this road was the trading post at Orient, at the forks of the Sauk River. Today this area is known as Bedal. Today the Mountain Loop Highway follows part of the Sauk River more or less along the route of the old wagon road.

== See also ==
- List of rivers in Washington
