= Glacier Peak =

Stratovolcano in Washington

- Dakobed; Takobia
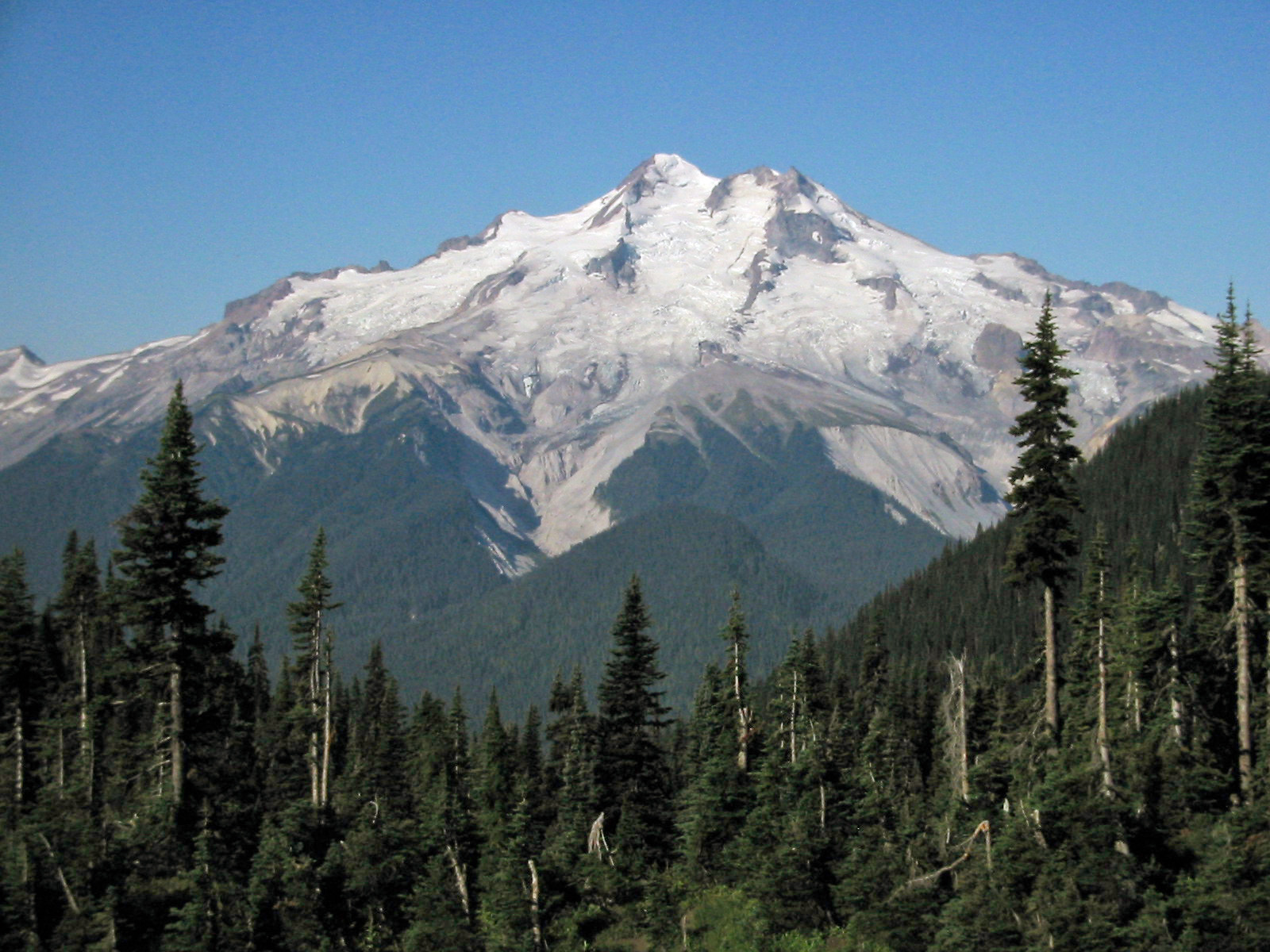
- East slope of Glacier Peak with Cool (left), Chocolate (descending from summit), North Guardian and Dusty Glaciers (right)

Highest point
- Elevation: 10,525+ ft (3,207+ m) NAVD 88
- Prominence: 7,498 ft (2,285 m)
- Listing: North America prominent peaks 55th
- Coordinates: 48°06′43″N 121°06′51″W

Geography
- Location within Washington (state)
- Location: Snohomish County, Washington, U.S.
- Parent range: Cascade Range
- Topo map: USGS Glacier Peak East

Geology
- Formed by: Subduction zone volcanism
- Rock age: Pleistocene
- Mountain type: Stratovolcano
- Volcanic arc: Cascade Volcanic Arc
- Last eruption: 1700

Climbing
- First ascent: 1898 by Thomas Gerdine and party
- Easiest route: Rock/ice climb on Sitkum Glacier

Glacier Peak or Dakobed (known in the Sauk-Suiattle dialect of the Lushootseed language as "Tda-ko-buh-ba" or "Takobia") is a stratovolcano in the U.S state of Washington. Located in the Glacier Peak Wilderness in Mount Baker–Snoqualmie National Forest, the volcano is visible from the west in Seattle, and from the north in the higher areas of eastern suburbs of Vancouver such as Coquitlam, New Westminster and Port Coquitlam. The volcano is the fourth tallest peak in Washington state and the most isolated volcano of the Cascade Volcanic Arc.

Compared to other volcanoes in the areas, relatively less is known about Glacier Peak. Local Native Americans have recognized Glacier Peak and other Washington volcanoes in their histories and stories. When American explorers reached the region, they learned basic information about surrounding landforms, but did not initially understand that Glacier Peak was a volcano. Positioned in Snohomish County, the volcano is only 70 miles (110 km) northeast of downtown Seattle. From locations in northern Seattle and northward, Glacier Peak is closer than the more famous Mount Rainier (Tahoma), but as Glacier Peak is set farther into the Cascades and almost 4,000 feet (1,200 m) shorter, it is much less noticeable than Mount Rainier.

Glacier Peak is the second most active of Washington's volcanoes, with eruptions as recently as 1700 AD ± 100 years. The volcano formed during the Pleistocene epoch, about one million years ago, and since the most recent ice age, it has produced some of the largest and most explosive eruptions in the state. When continental ice sheets retreated from the region, Glacier Peak began to erupt regularly, erupting explosively five times in the past 3,000 years. It has erupted repeatedly during at least six periods; two of these eruptions have been among the largest in Washington.

== Geology ==
Remnants of past (prehistoric) lava domes are main components of the summit of the volcano, in addition to its false summit, Disappointment Peak. Past pyroclastic flow deposits are easily visible in river valleys near the volcano, likely caused by lava dome collapse, along with ridges found east of the summit consisting of ash cloud remains. On its western flank, the volcano also has a lahar, or mudflow deposit, which runs for about 22 miles (35 km) into the White Chuck River Valley around 14,000 years ago. Ten other pyroclastic flow deposits are visible, all identified as relatively 10,000 years old. There is also a considerably newer mudflow, about 5,500 years old, which covers an area of 9.3 mi (15 km) between the same river valley, along with two small incidents both under 3,000 years old. Another lahar, of unidentified age, was rich in oxyhornblende dacite; and continued for 30 km (19 mi) into the Sauk River.

There are also ash cloud deposits on the opposite eastern flank of the volcano. Studies of the mountain have to date been unable to find any correspondence with pyroclastic flows, but several past mudflows have been identified. In the Dusty Creek valley, which runs east from the mountain, there is a lahar at least 98 ft (30 m) thick, containing pyroclastic flow deposits and other mudflows. However, this large mudflow is part of a 980-foot-thick (300 m) concentration of past incidents at the volcano that spans the Dusty Creek and Chocolate Creek valleys. The area contains at least 2.4 cubic miles (10 km^{3}) of lithic debris. Tephra deposits are for the most part constrained to the left flank of the volcano, and at least nine past incidents have been identified. These form several layers of tephra constructing the mountain. Smaller eruptions involving tephra occurred between 6,900 and 5,500 years ago, again between 3,450 and 200 years ago, and as recently as 316 to 90 years ago.

On the mountain, about 5,900 ft (1,800 m) up, are three additional cinder cones — one at the head of White Chuck River, one at Dishpan Gap, and one near Indian Pass. The volcano has also created thermal features such as hot springs. There were three hot springs on the mountain: Gamma, Kennedy, and Sulphur, but Kennedy Hot Springs was destroyed and buried in a slide.

=== Tectonic setting ===
Diagram of plate tectonics for Cascade Range

The volcano is located in Washington, and is one of the five major stratovolcanoes there. Situated in the Cascade Volcanic Arc, the volcano was created by subduction of the oceanic Juan de Fuca Plate under the North American Plate. Convergence between the two continues at a rate of 1.6 inches (4 cm) per year. This range has been volcanically active for about 36 million years, and the rocks that make up its volcanoes are between 55 and 42 million years old. Eruptions within the range are irregular and do not occur all at once. In an attempt to organize the volcanoes by age, scientists typically divide them into the High Cascades, younger volcanoes, and the Western Cascades, consisting of the older volcanoes. However, the vents in Washington are all of different ages so none of its volcanoes are included in either of the sections.

== History ==
Around the area, there were many Native Americans, and along with other Washington volcanoes, the mountain was recognized by them as a spirit. When European-American explorers reached the area, they learned about the mountain, though only partially, through local legends. Although the local people described Glacier Peak as a vital part of their storytelling and beliefs, when other volcanoes in the area were mapped, Glacier Peak was left out. In 1850 natives mentioned the volcano to naturalist George Gibbs saying that the volcano had once "smoked". In 1898 the volcano was finally documented on a map.

Native Americans also used the area around the Cascades for their agriculture, leading them to often congregate in the region. As a result, gold miners eventually reached the area in the 1870s–1890s, searching for resources and rich land. The first white man recorded to observe the mountain—Daniel Lindsley—was an employee of the Northern Pacific Railroad Company searching for possible railroad routes when he saw it in 1870.

== Eruptive history ==
Despite its elevation of 10,541 feet (3,213 m), Glacier Peak is a small stratovolcano. Its relatively high summit is a consequence of its location atop a high ridge, but its volcanic portion extends only 1,600–3,200 feet (500–1,000 m) above the underlying ridge. Another Cascade Arc volcano with similar geomorphology is the Mount Meager massif in southwestern British Columbia, Canada, which is situated on a 1,300 ft (400 m) ridge of nonvolcanic, crystalline and metamorphic rock.

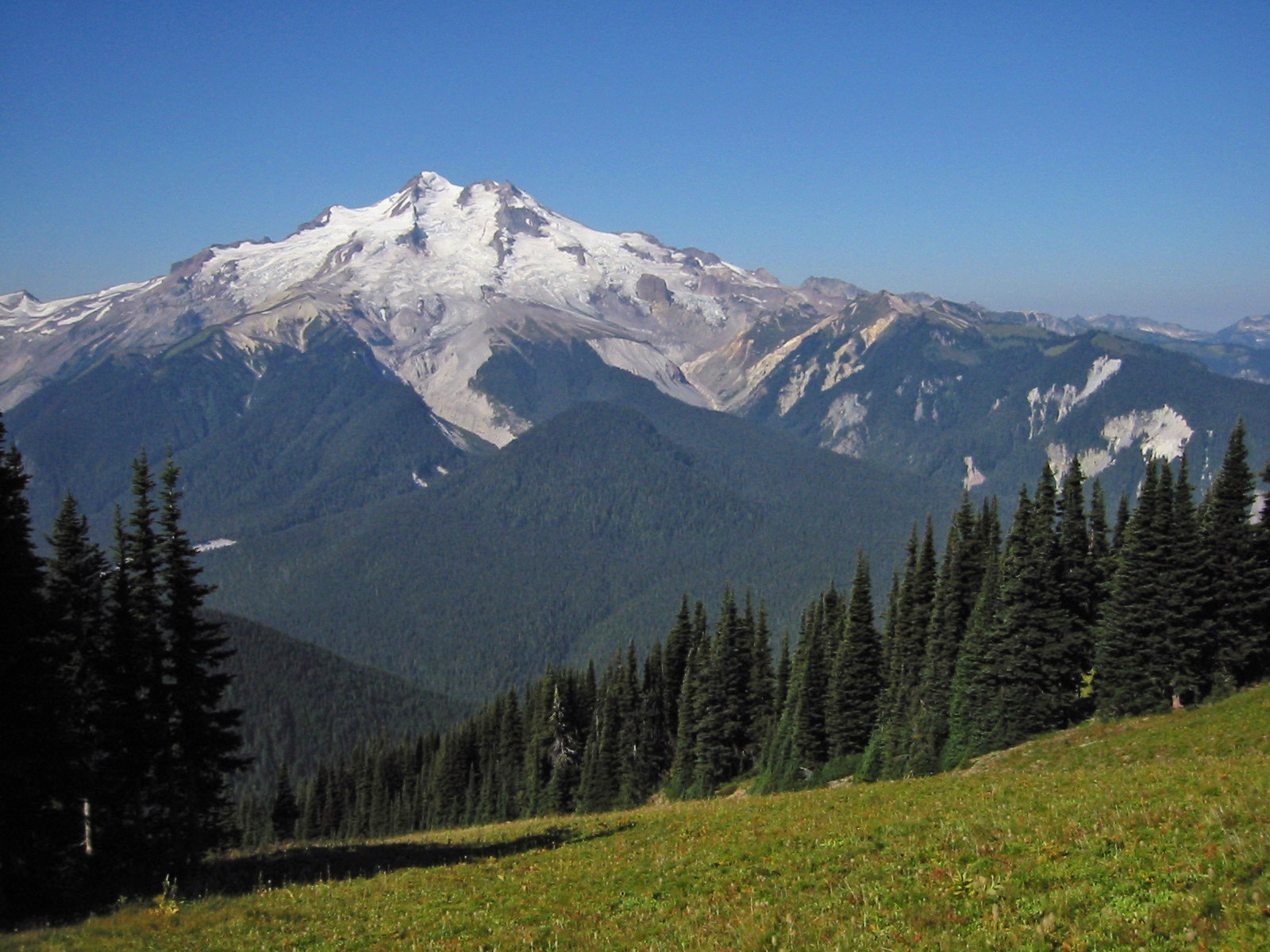
View from Liberty Cap across the Suiattle River Valley

Of the five major volcanoes in Washington, only Glacier Peak and Mount St. Helens have had large eruptions in the past 15,000 years. Since both volcanoes generate magma of dacitic origin, the viscous magma builds up as it cannot flow through the eruptive vent. Gradually, the pressure grows, culminating in an explosion that ejects materials such as tephra, which in its simplest form, is ash.

Tephrochronology and radiocarbon dating indicate that Glacier Peak eruptions occurred in 1700 AD ± 100 years, 1300 AD ± 300 years, 900 AD ± 50 years, 200 AD ± 50 years, 850 BC, 3150 BC, and in 3550 BC. The Volcanic Explosivity Index (VEI) for three of these was 2 to 4, small compared to the 5 of the 1980 eruption of Mount St. Helens. They were characterized mainly by a central vent eruption, followed by an explosive eruption. These eruptions varied in outcome; some produced lahars, some pyroclastic flows, and others lava domes. The volcano has had one eruption with a VEI of 2, one with a VEI of 4, and possibly another with a VEI of 3.

A little more than 13,000 years ago, a sequence of nine tephra eruptions occurred within a period of less than a few hundred years. Associated with these eruptions were pyroclastic flows. Mixed with snow, ice and water, these formed lahars that raced into three nearby rivers, filling their valleys with deep deposits. Subsequently, the mudflows drained into both the North Fork of the Stillaguamish River (at that time an outlet of the Sauk River) and Skagit Rivers. In Arlington, 60 miles (97 km) downstream, lahars deposited seven feet of sediment. Subsequent erosion of lahar deposits near Darrington led to the current river system with the Stillaguamish River separated from the Sauk/Skagit Rivers. Lahar debris was deposited along both the Skagit and Stillaguamish Rivers all the way to Puget Sound. A small portion of the erupted tephra was deposited locally. However, most of the tephra reached higher levels of the atmosphere, and was transported by the wind hundreds of miles. Deposits from this congregation were as thick as 1 foot (0.30 m) near Chelan and 0.3 inches (7.6 mm) near Missoula, Montana. The table below shows the three largest eruptions from this sequence.

Plinian Eruptions ~13,000 Years Ago
Unit Name	DRE Volume	Bulk Deposit Volume	Plume Height
Layer B	2.1 km^{3} (0.50 cu mi)	6.5 km^{3} (1.6 cu mi)	31 km (19 mi)
Layer M	0.4 km^{3} (0.096 cu mi)	1.1 km^{3} (0.26 cu mi)	N/A
Layer G	1.9 km^{3} (0.46 cu mi)	6.0 km^{3} (1.4 cu mi)	32 km (20 mi)

Since these events, Glacier Peak has produced several lahars. The largest mudflows were 5,900 and 1,800 years ago and were associated with dome-building eruptions. In both cases, the lahars traveled down the Skagit River to Puget Sound.

=== Hazards ===
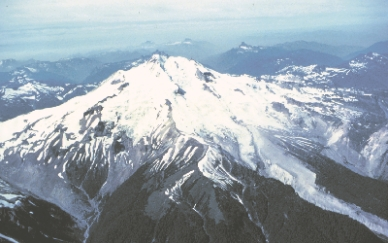
Glacier Peak from the southeast

The risk of an eruption in any given year is currently estimated as 1 in 1,000. As of 2018, Glacier Peak is classified as one of the 18 most dangerous volcanoes in the United States.

When lahars reach populated areas, they can bury structures and people. An example was the Armero tragedy at Nevado del Ruiz where 23,000 died from an enormous mudflow. Lahars from Glacier Peak pose a similar threat to the small communities of Darrington, Arlington, and Concrete with a lesser threat to the larger and rapidly growing towns of Mount Vernon and Burlington, as well as other communities along the lower Skagit and Stillaguamish Rivers. A 2005 study conducted by the United States Geological Survey identified nine Cascade volcanoes, including Glacier Peak, as "very-high-threat volcanoes with inadequate monitoring". At the time of the study, only one seismometer was installed on Glacier Peak that had not "worked in two years". As of 2023, the PNSN still operates only one seismometer on Glacier Peak.

In 2018, the USGS applied to add four more stations, but regulations protecting federal wilderness areas prohibit the use of helicopters that are needed to transport materials; advocacy groups opposed an exemption for the project and filed objections. In 2019, Congress passed the National Volcano Early Warning and Monitoring System Act to authorize more monitoring stations, but did not include funding to construct them. Permits were granted by the U.S. Forest Service in June 2022.

== Climate ==
Climate data for Glacier Peak Summit. 1991-2020
Month	Jan	Feb	Mar	Apr	May	Jun	Jul	Aug	Sep	Oct	Nov	Dec	Year
Mean daily maximum °F (°C)	21.1 (−6.1)	20.5 (−6.4)	21.8 (−5.7)	26.2 (−3.2)	35.0 (1.7)	41.3 (5.2)	51.4 (10.8)	51.9 (11.1)	46.4 (8.0)	35.8 (2.1)	24.2 (−4.3)	19.6 (−6.9)	32.9 (0.5)
Daily mean °F (°C)	16.0 (−8.9)	14.0 (−10.0)	14.1 (−9.9)	17.2 (−8.2)	25.1 (−3.8)	30.8 (−0.7)	39.4 (4.1)	40.1 (4.5)	35.3 (1.8)	26.8 (−2.9)	18.5 (−7.5)	14.8 (−9.6)	24.3 (−4.3)
Mean daily minimum °F (°C)	10.8 (−11.8)	7.5 (−13.6)	6.4 (−14.2)	8.3 (−13.2)	15.2 (−9.3)	20.2 (−6.6)	27.4 (−2.6)	28.2 (−2.1)	24.2 (−4.3)	17.8 (−7.9)	12.9 (−10.6)	9.9 (−12.3)	15.7 (−9.1)
Average precipitation inches (mm)	13.78 (350)	10.65 (271)	11.26 (286)	6.59 (167)	4.33 (110)	3.33 (85)	1.83 (46)	2.27 (58)	4.06 (103)	11.31 (287)	16.43 (417)	16.18 (411)	102.02 (2,591)
Average dew point °F (°C)	8.6 (−13.0)	5.3 (−14.8)	4.1 (−15.5)	4.5 (−15.3)	10.7 (−11.8)	15.8 (−9.0)	19.4 (−7.0)	19.2 (−7.1)	16.0 (−8.9)	13.1 (−10.5)	10.3 (−12.1)	8.4 (−13.1)	11.3 (−11.5)
Source: PRISM Climate Group

=== Glaciers ===
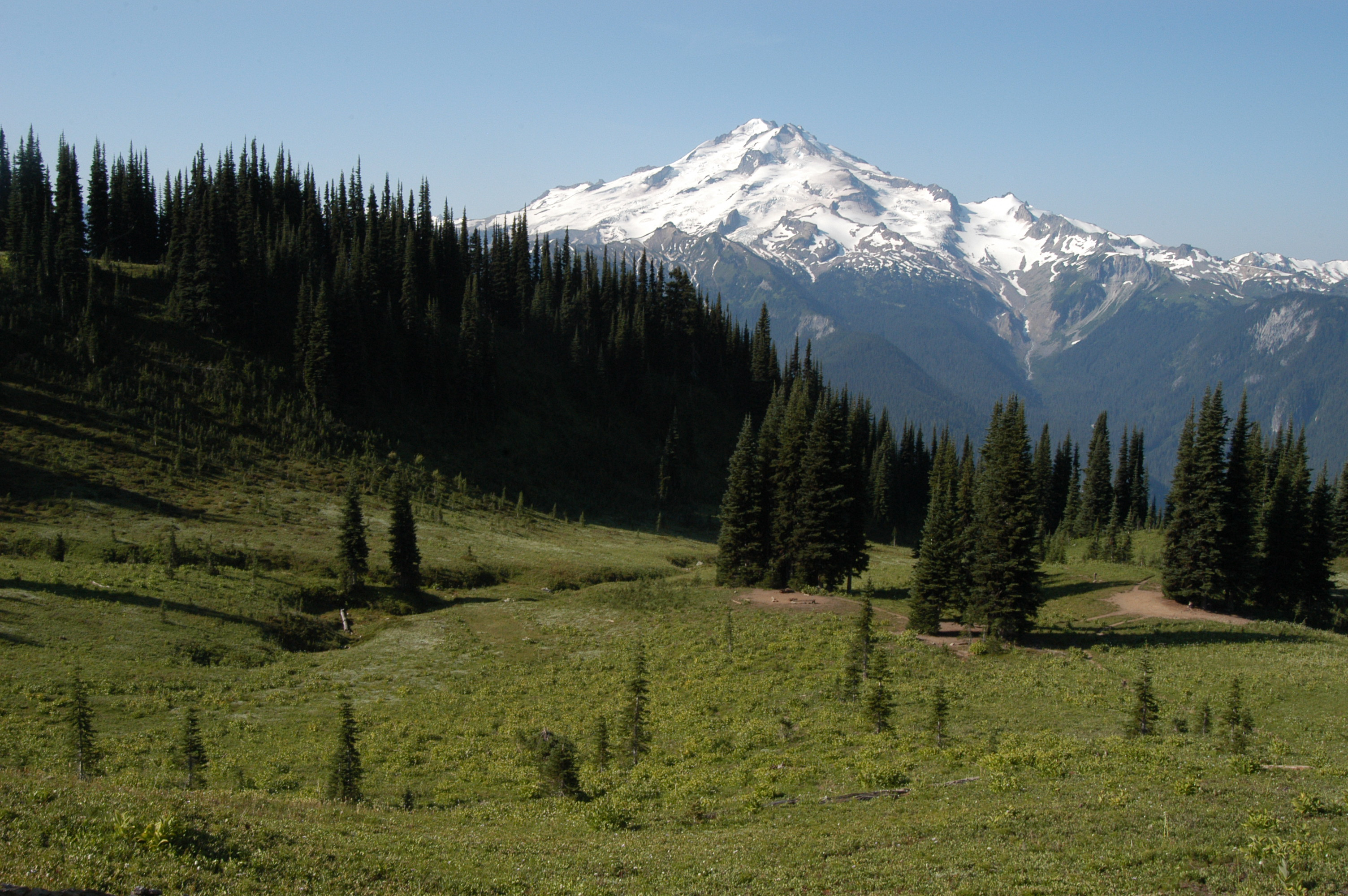
View of the northeast face from Image Lake

Eleven significant glaciers cover Glacier Peak. When C.E. Rusk first saw these glaciers in 1906 they were beginning to retreat, but were still very advanced. The average retreat of Glacier Peak glaciers from the Little Ice Age to the 1958 positions was 5,381 feet (1,640 m). Richard Hubley noted that North Cascade glaciers began to advance in the early 1950s, after 30 years of rapid retreat. The advance was in response to a sharp rise in winter precipitation and a decline in summer temperature beginning in 1944. Ten of the fifteen glaciers around Glacier Peak advanced, including all of the glaciers directly on the mountain's slopes. Advances of Glacier Peak glaciers ranged from 50 to 1,575 feet (15 to 480 m) and culminated in 1978. All eleven Glacier Peak glaciers that advanced during the 1950–79 period emplaced identifiable maximum advance terminal moraines. From 1984 to 2005, the average retreat of eight Glacier Peak glaciers from their recent maximum positions was 1,017 feet (310 m). Milk Lake Glacier, on the north flank of the mountain, melted away altogether in the 1990s. Due to global warming, glaciated area shrunk by a third by 2025 and is estimated to be almost gone by 2075.

== Recreation ==
The Pacific Crest Trail passes near Glacier Peak. The Suiattle River crossing is a well-known feature on the Pacific Crest Trail (PCT) as it passes through the area. The Suiattle PCT crossing used to have a bridge crossing until it was flooded out by storms in late 2003.

The first recorded person to climb the mountain was Thomas Gerdine, along with a group of United States Geological Survey scientists, Sam Strom, A. H. Dubor, and Darcy Bard, in 1897. The climb is Alpine Grade I or II.

The easiest ski route is about 5 miles (8.0 km) of walking along the White Chuck River Trail (Forest Service Trail No. 643) and up the Sitkum Glacier. The trail is reached via Forest Service Road No. 23. The Sitkum Glacier ski route is rated blue to black diamond for both the ascent and the descent.

== Cultural references ==
The Seattle-based composer, Alan Hovhaness, dedicated his Symphony no.66 as "Hymn to Glacier Peak": see Symphony no.66 (Hovhaness).

The non-fiction book Encounters with the Archdruid by John McPhee, which portrays the environmental advocacy of David Brower, devotes the first of its three main sections to a conflict over mineral prospecting around Glacier Peak.

== See also ==
- List of mountain peaks of North America
  - List of mountain peaks of the United States
    - List of mountain peaks of Washington (state)
      - List of highest points in Washington by county
- List of Ultras of the United States
- List of volcanoes in the United States
