= Suiattle =

Suiattle /suˈwɒtəl/ may refer to:

- The Suiattle River, a river in Snohomish and Skagit Counties, Washington
  - The Suiattle Valley
  - The Suiattle River Road
- The Sauk–Suiattle Indian Tribe, an Indian tribe of Skagit and Snohomish counties
  - The Sauk–Suiattle Indian Reservation
- The Suiattle Glacier
