= Black Mountain (Washington) =

Mountain in Washington (state), United States

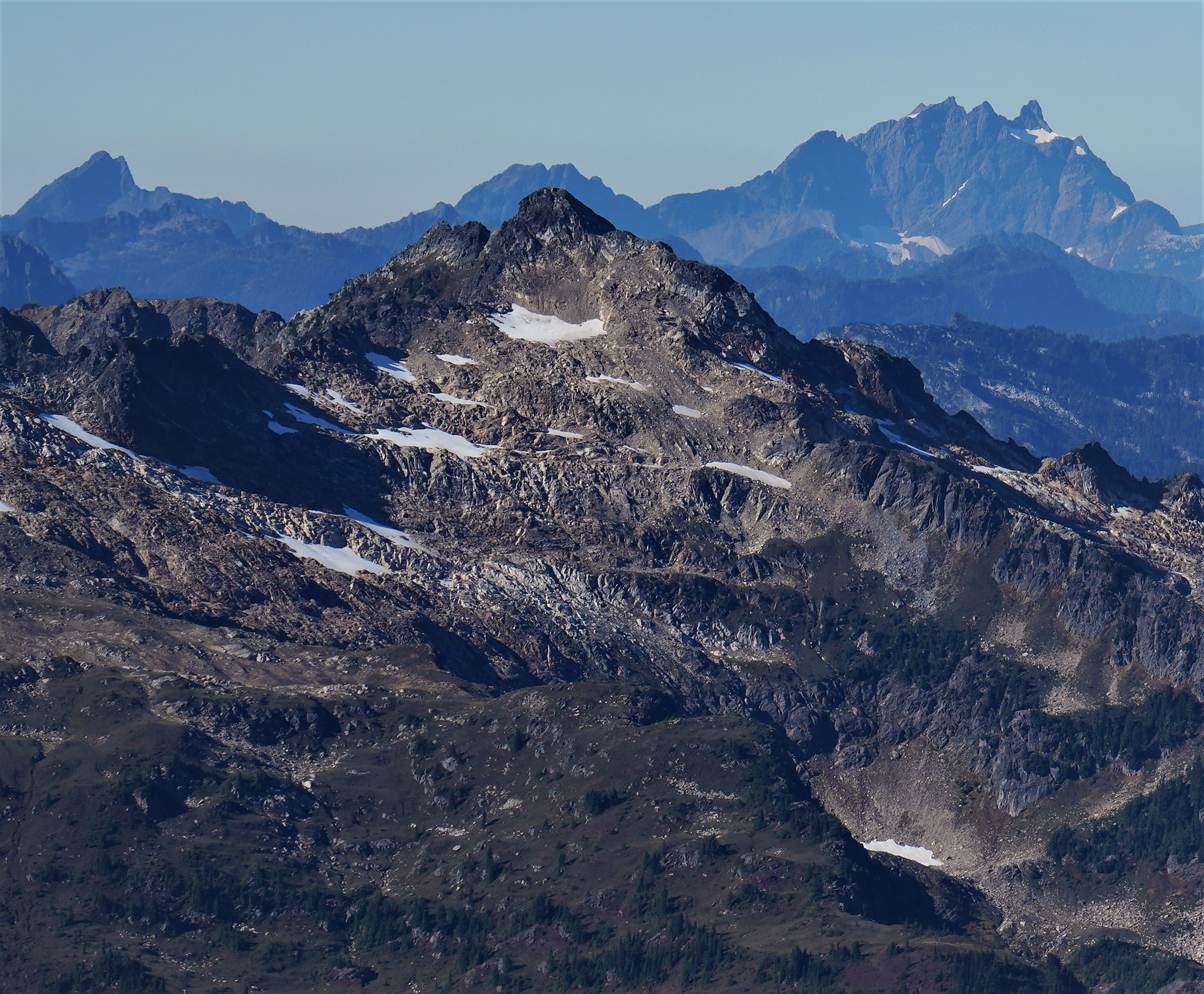
- East aspect, centered

Highest point
- Elevation: 7,262 ft (2,213 m)
- Prominence: 923 ft (281 m)
- Parent peak: Kololo Peaks (8,220 ft)
- Isolation: 3.45 mi (5.55 km)
- Coordinates: 48°04′54″N 121°12′24″W

Geography
- Location within Washington (state) Location within the United States
- Interactive map of Black Mountain
- Location: Snohomish County, Washington, U.S.
- Parent range: Cascade Range; North Cascades
- Topo map: USGS Glacier Peak West

Geology
- Rock age: Late Cretaceous
- Rock type: magmatic gneiss

Climbing
- First ascent: 1897
- Easiest route: class 2 scrambling

Black Mountain is a 7,262-foot-elevation (2,213-meter) summit located in the North Cascades, in Snohomish County of Washington state. The mountain is situated in the Glacier Peak Wilderness on land managed by Mount Baker-Snoqualmie National Forest. Neighbors include line parent Kololo Peaks, 6 mi (9.7 km) to the east, Painted Mountain two miles west, and Glacier Peak is 5 mi (8.0 km) to the northeast. Precipitation runoff from the peak drains west into tributaries of the North Fork Sauk River, and east into the White Chuck River. Topographic relief is significant as the summit rises 3,460 feet (1,050 meters) above the White Chuck in two miles. The first ascent of the summit was likely made in 1897 by a survey team including A. H. Dubor, Thomas G. Gerdine, and Sam Strom, who named the mountain for the dark color of its rock. The ascent from the north via Lake Byrne is non-technical.

== Climate ==
Black Mountain is located in the marine west coast climate zone of western North America. Most weather fronts originate in the Pacific Ocean, and travel northeast toward the Cascade Mountains. As fronts approach the North Cascades, they are forced upward by the peaks of the Cascade Range, causing them to drop their moisture in the form of rain or snowfall onto the Cascades (Orographic lift). As a result, the west side of the North Cascades experiences high precipitation, especially during the winter months in the form of snowfall. Because of maritime influence, snow tends to be wet and heavy, resulting in avalanche danger. Due to its temperate climate and proximity to the Pacific Ocean, areas west of the Cascade Crest very rarely experience temperatures below 0 °F (−18 °C) or above 80 °F (27 °C). During winter months, weather is usually cloudy, but due to high pressure systems over the Pacific Ocean that intensify during summer months, there is often little or no cloud cover during the summer.

== Geology ==
The North Cascades feature some of the most rugged topography in the Cascade Range with craggy peaks, spires, ridges, and deep glacial valleys. Geological events occurring many years ago created the diverse topography and drastic elevation changes over the Cascade Range leading to the various climate differences.

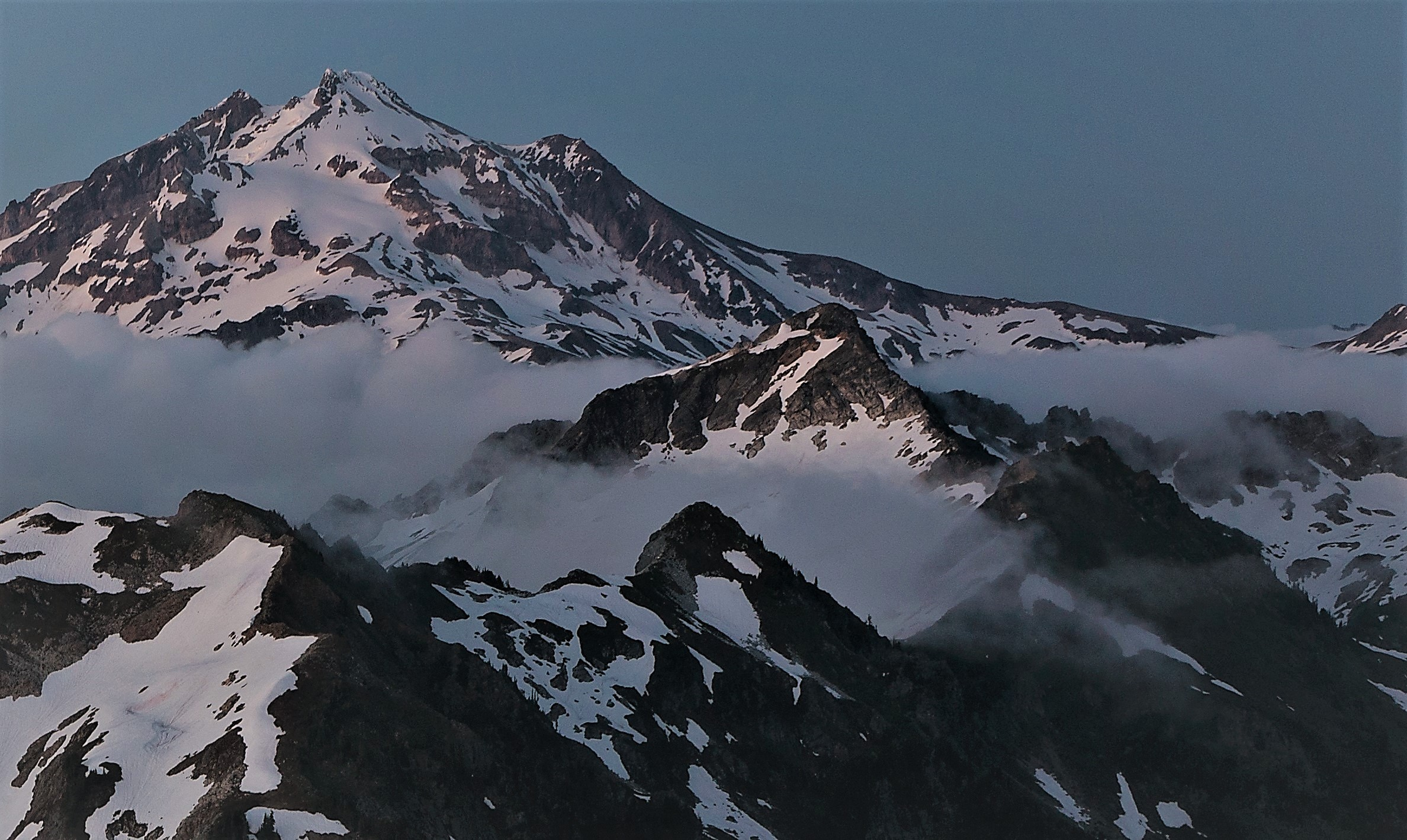
Glacier Peak (upper left) and Black Mountain (centered) from the west

The history of the formation of the Cascade Mountains dates back millions of years ago to the late Eocene Epoch. With the North American Plate overriding the Pacific Plate, episodes of volcanic igneous activity persisted. Glacier Peak, a stratovolcano that is 5 mi (8.0 km) northeast of Black Mountain, began forming in the mid-Pleistocene. In addition, small fragments of the oceanic and continental lithosphere called terranes created the North Cascades about 50 million years ago.

During the Pleistocene period dating back over two million years ago, glaciation advancing and retreating repeatedly scoured the landscape leaving deposits of rock debris. The U-shaped cross section of the river valleys is a result of recent glaciation. Uplift and faulting in combination with glaciation have been the dominant processes which have created the tall peaks and deep valleys of the North Cascades area.

== Gallery ==
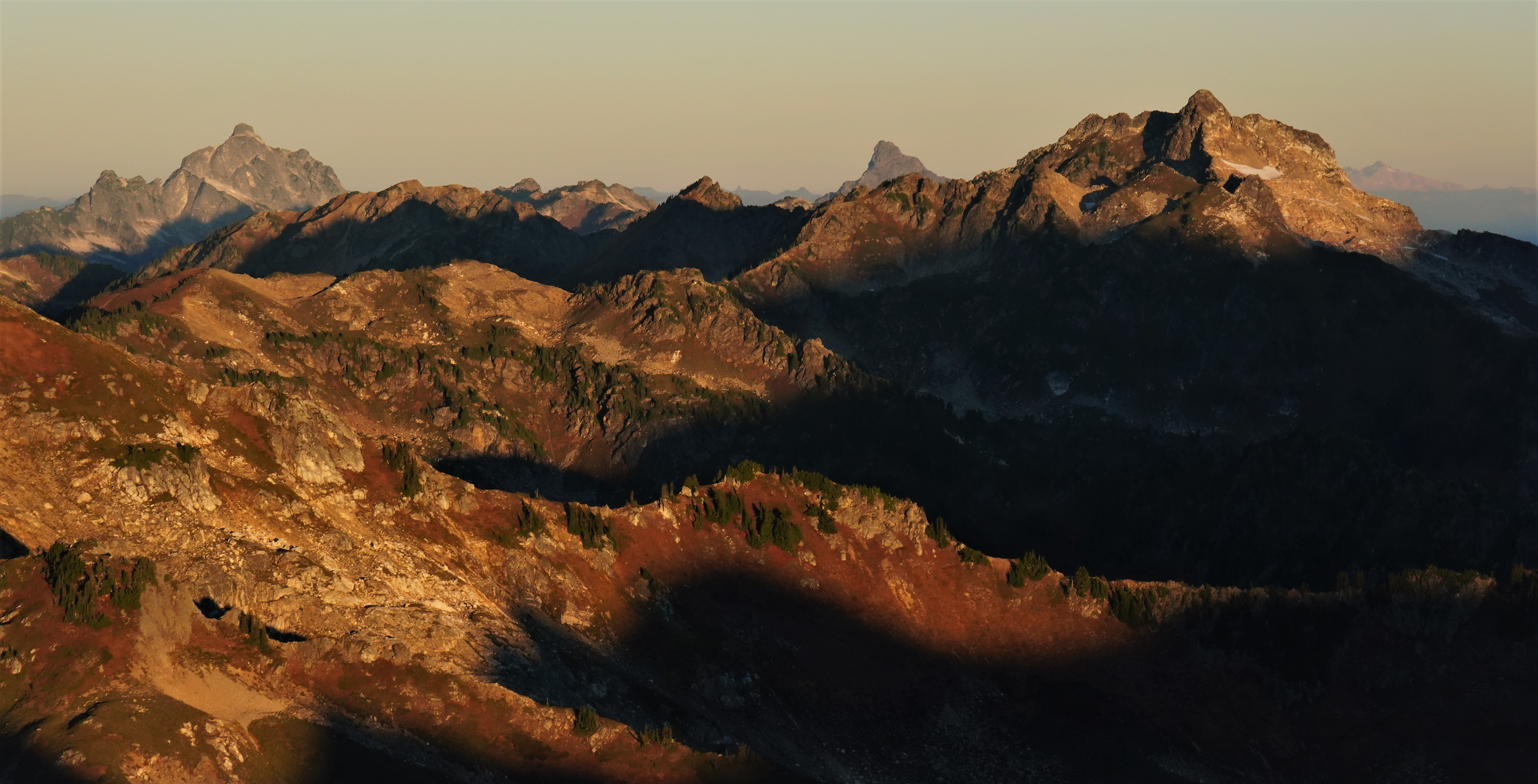
Pugh Mountain (distant left) and Black Mountain (right), from the southeast

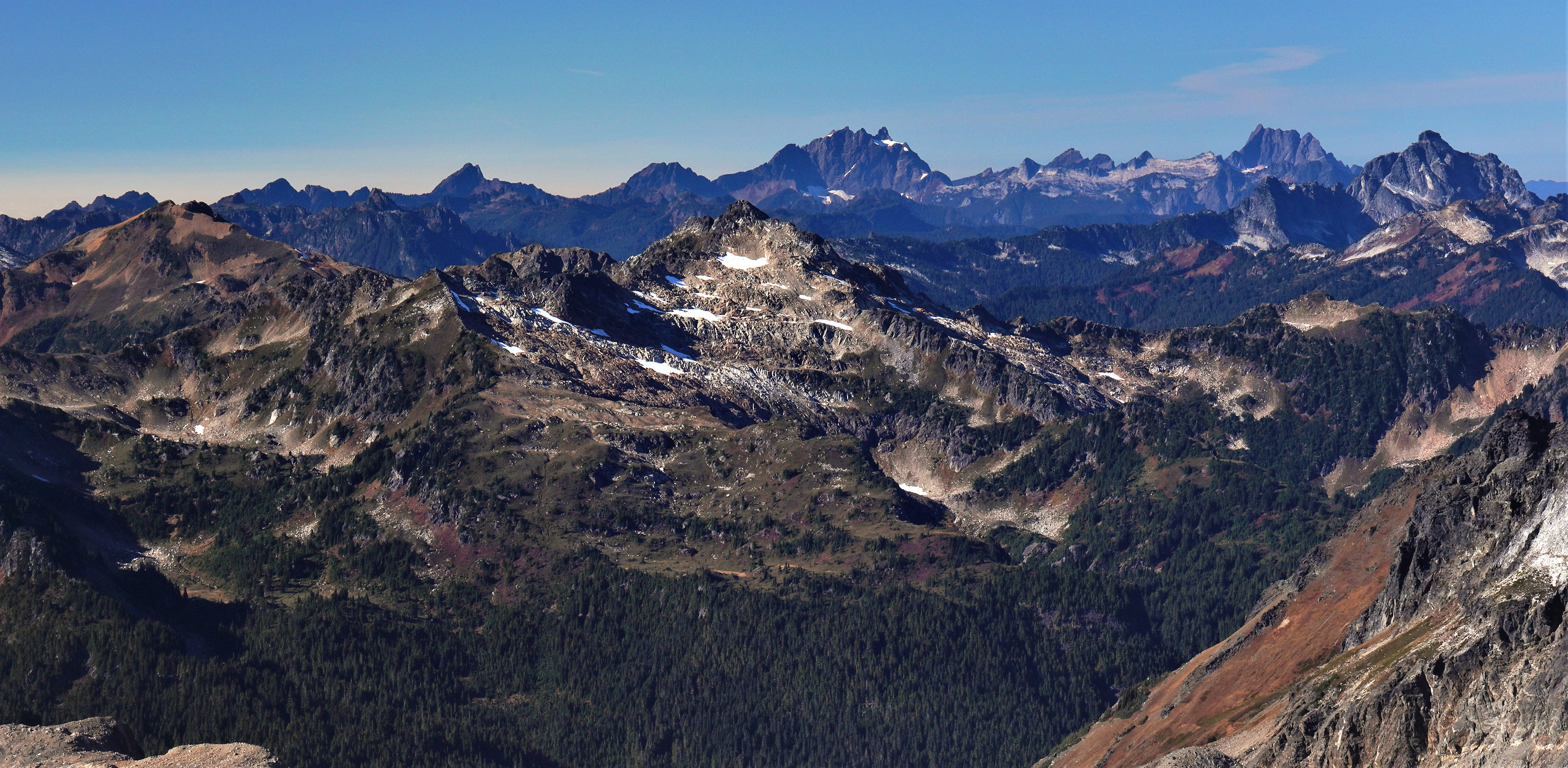
East aspect of Black Mountain, centered.

== See also ==
- Geography of the North Cascades
