= Kololo (disambiguation) =

Kololo is a hill in Kampala, Uganda's capital.

- former Kampala Airport, commonly known as Kololo Airstrip and officially as Kololo Ceremonial Grounds
- Kololo Senior Secondary School, Kampala, Uganda

Kololo may also refer to:

== People ==
- Kololo people, a Sotho-Tswana people of Southern Africa
- Kololo language, a Sotho-Tswana language of the Kololo people

== Places ==
- Kololo Game Reserve, 3000 ha (30 km^{2}) in South Africa
- Kololo Peaks, a mountain in Washington State, US
