= White River Glacier =

White River Glacier may refer to:

- White River Glacier (Oregon)
- White River Glacier (Washington)
