= Kololo Peaks =

Mountain in Washington (state), United States

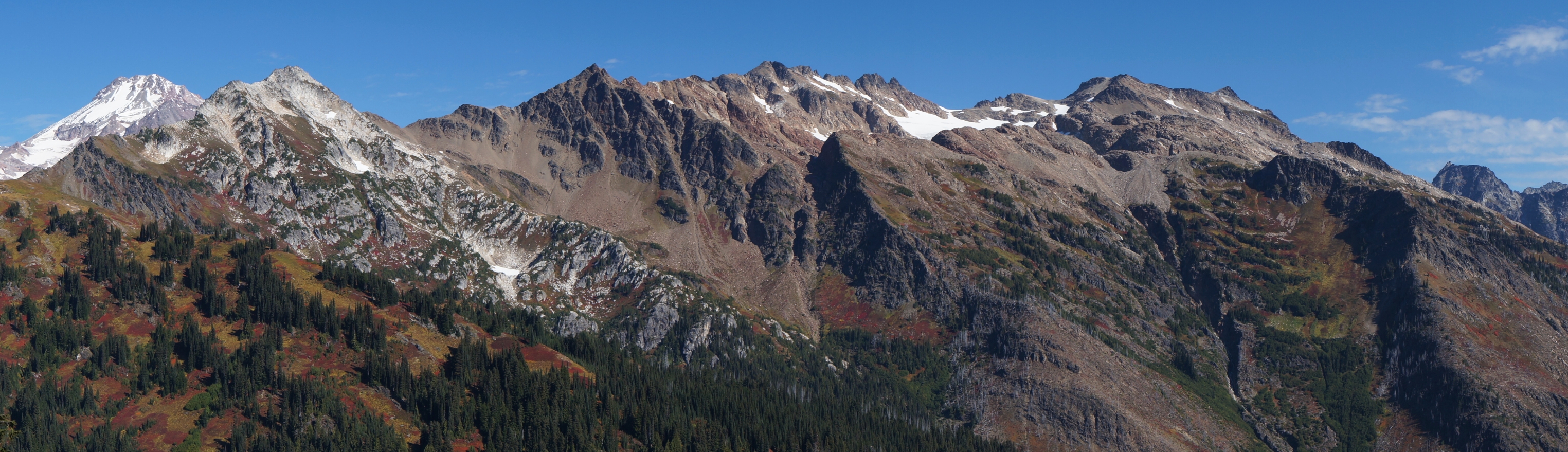
- Kololo Peaks seen from Pacific Crest Trail

Highest point
- Elevation: 8,200 ft (2,500 m)
- Prominence: 880 ft (270 m)
- Parent peak: Glacier Peak (10,540 ft)
- Isolation: 3.38 mi (5.44 km)
- Coordinates: 48°03′51″N 121°05′50″W

Geography
- Location within Washington (state) Location within the United States
- Interactive map of Kololo Peaks
- Country: United States
- State: Washington
- County: Snohomish / Chelan
- Protected area: Glacier Peak Wilderness
- Parent range: Cascade Range
- Topo map: USGS Glacier Peak East

Climbing
- Easiest route: Scrambling

Kololo Peaks is an 8,200+ ft (2,500+ m) mountain located in the Glacier Peak Wilderness of the North Cascades in Washington state. The mountain is situated on the crest of the Cascade Range, on the shared border of Snohomish County and Chelan County, and also straddling the boundary between Mount Baker-Snoqualmie National Forest and Wenatchee National Forest. The nearest higher peak is Glacier Peak, 3.29 mi (5.29 km) to the north. Precipitation runoff and meltwater from the White River Glacier on the southeast slope drains into White River. On the west slope, the White Chuck Glacier drains into the White Chuck River, and the Suiattle Glacier and Honeycomb Glacier on the north and east sides drain into the Suiattle River. Surrounded by these glaciers, Fred Beckey in his Cascade Alpine Guide describes the mountain as being almost a nunatak.

== Geology ==
The North Cascades feature some of the most rugged topography in the Cascade Range with craggy peaks, spires, ridges, and deep glacial valleys. Geological events occurring many years ago created the diverse topography and drastic elevation changes over the Cascade Range leading to the various climate differences.

The history of the formation of the Cascade Mountains dates back millions of years ago to the late Eocene Epoch. With the North American Plate overriding the Pacific Plate, episodes of volcanic igneous activity persisted. Glacier Peak, a stratovolcano that is 3.29 mi (5.29 km) north of Kololo Peaks, began forming in the mid-Pleistocene. In addition, small fragments of the oceanic and continental lithosphere called terranes created the North Cascades about 50 million years ago.

During the Pleistocene period dating back over two million years ago, glaciation advancing and retreating repeatedly scoured the landscape leaving deposits of rock debris. The U-shaped cross section of the river valleys is a result of recent glaciation. Uplift and faulting in combination with glaciation have been the dominant processes which have created the tall peaks and deep valleys of the North Cascades area.

== Climate ==
Kololo Peaks is located in the marine west coast climate zone of western North America. Most weather fronts originating in the Pacific Ocean travel northeast toward the Cascade Mountains. As fronts approach the North Cascades, they are forced upward by the peaks of the Cascade Range (orographic lift), causing them to drop their moisture in the form of rain or snowfall onto the Cascades. As a result, the west side of the North Cascades experiences high precipitation, especially during the winter months in the form of snowfall. Because of maritime influence, snow tends to be wet and heavy, resulting in high avalanche danger. During winter months, weather is usually cloudy, but due to high pressure systems over the Pacific Ocean that intensify during summer months, there is often little or no cloud cover during the summer. Due to its temperate climate and proximity to the Pacific Ocean, areas west of the Cascade Crest very rarely experience temperatures below 0 °F (−18 °C) or above 80 °F (27 °C).

== Gallery ==
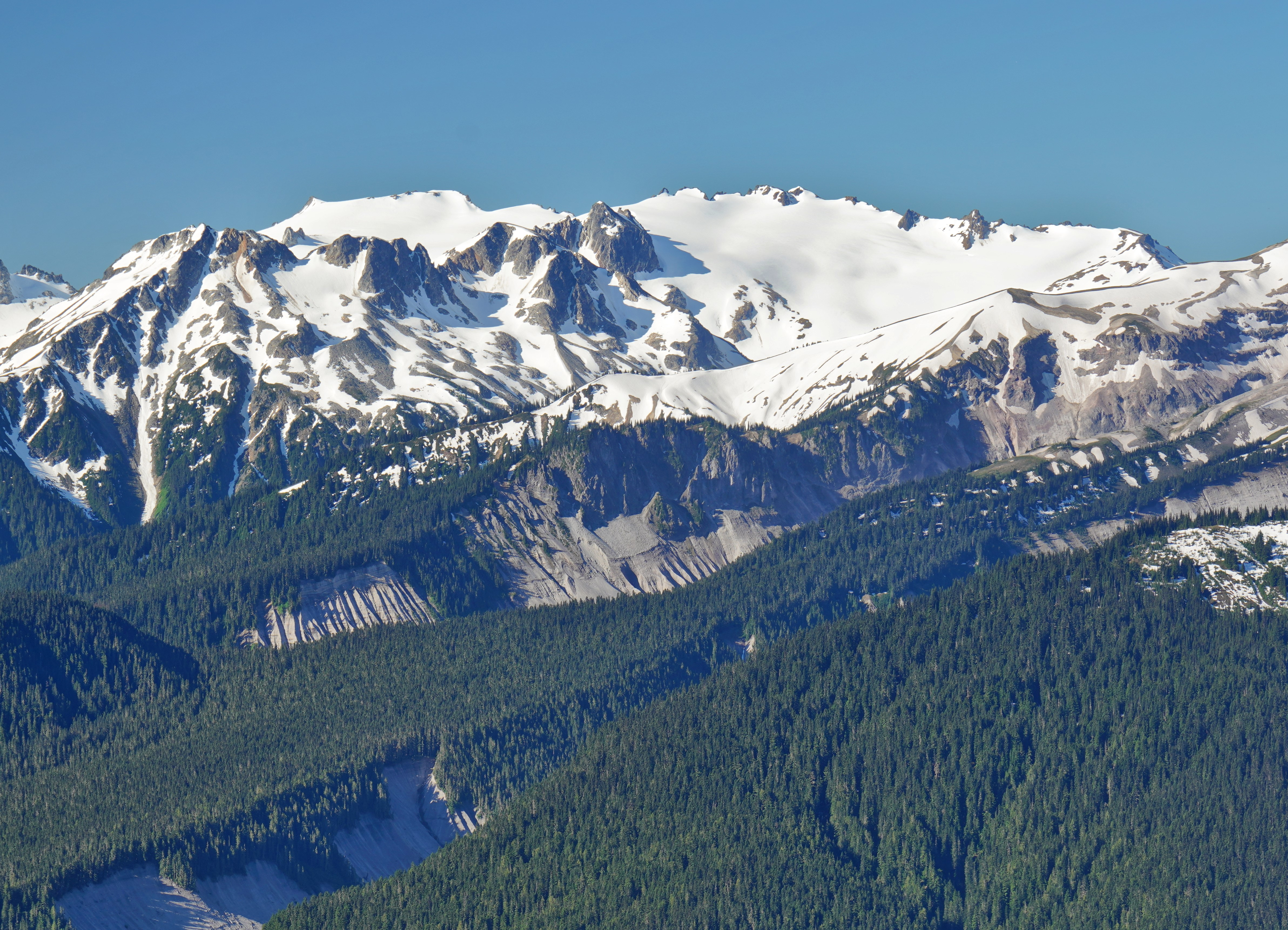
North aspect of Kololo Peaks viewed from Miners Ridge

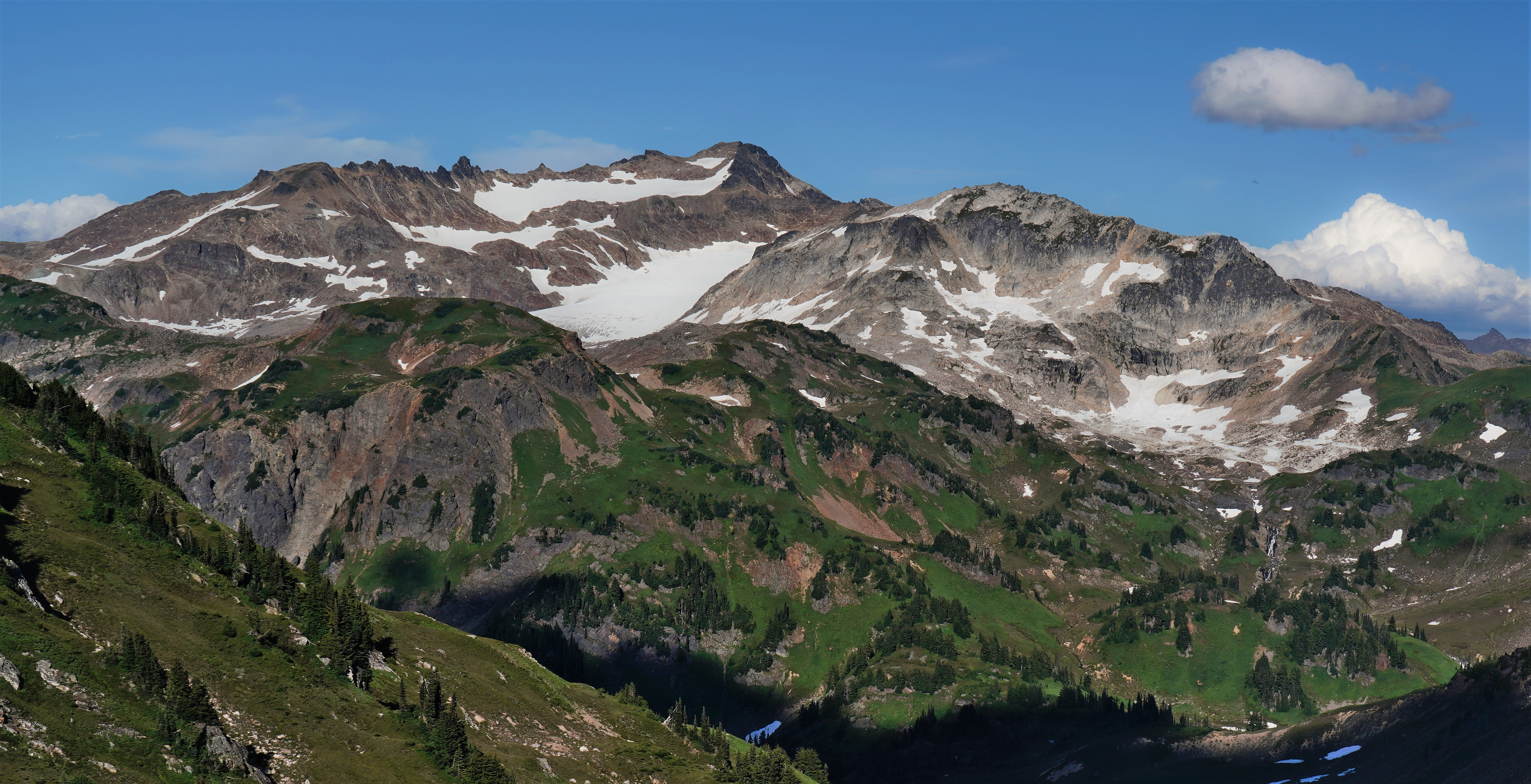
West aspect

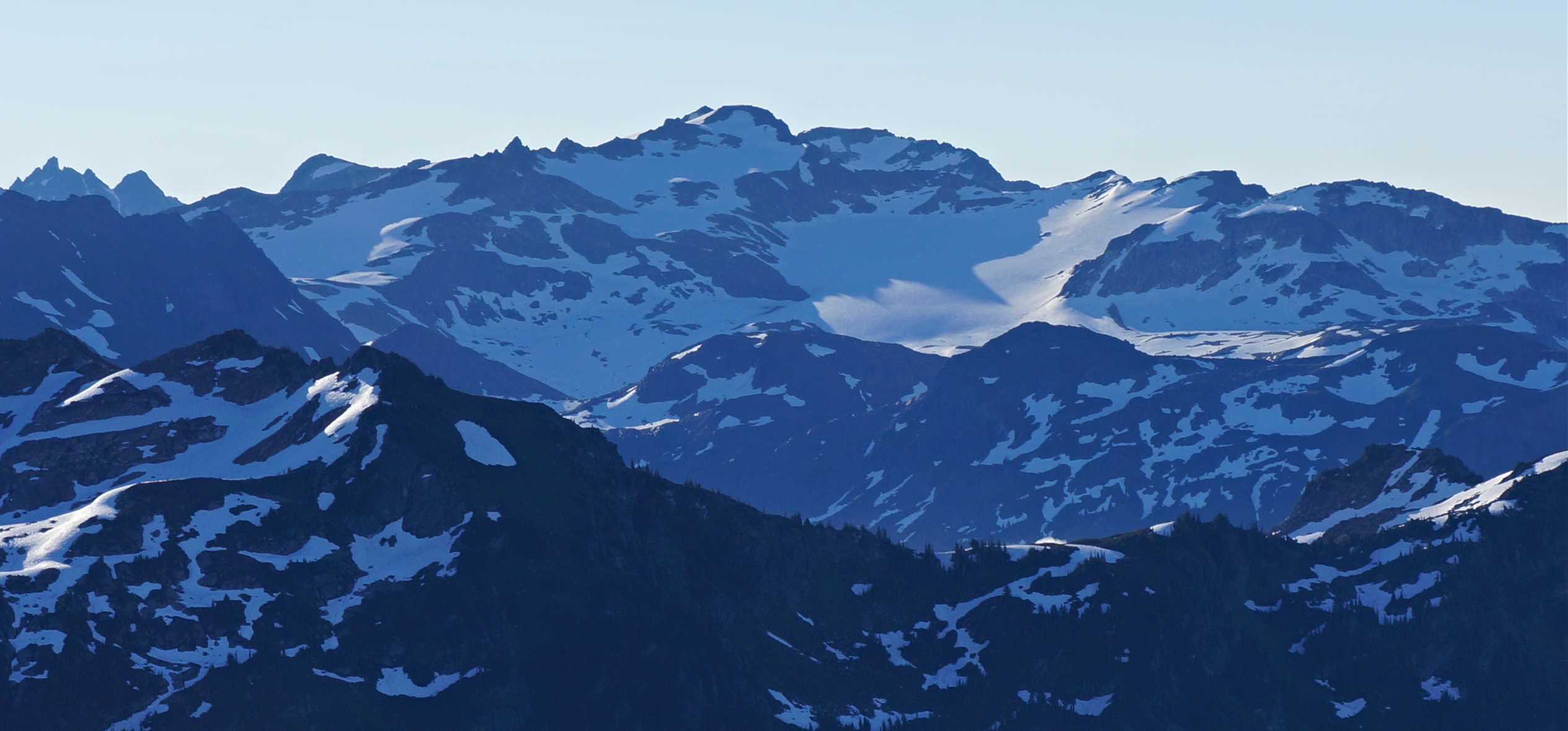
Kololo Peaks from the east (from Painted Mountain)

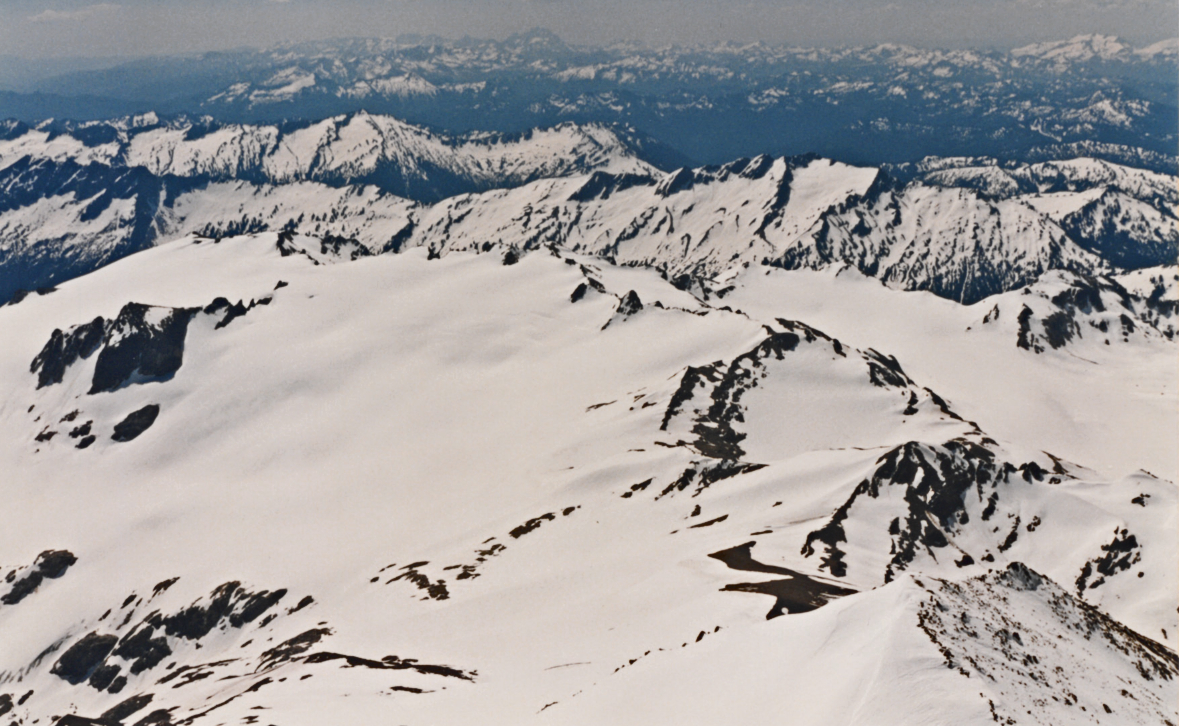
Looking down at Kololo Peaks from Glacier Peak

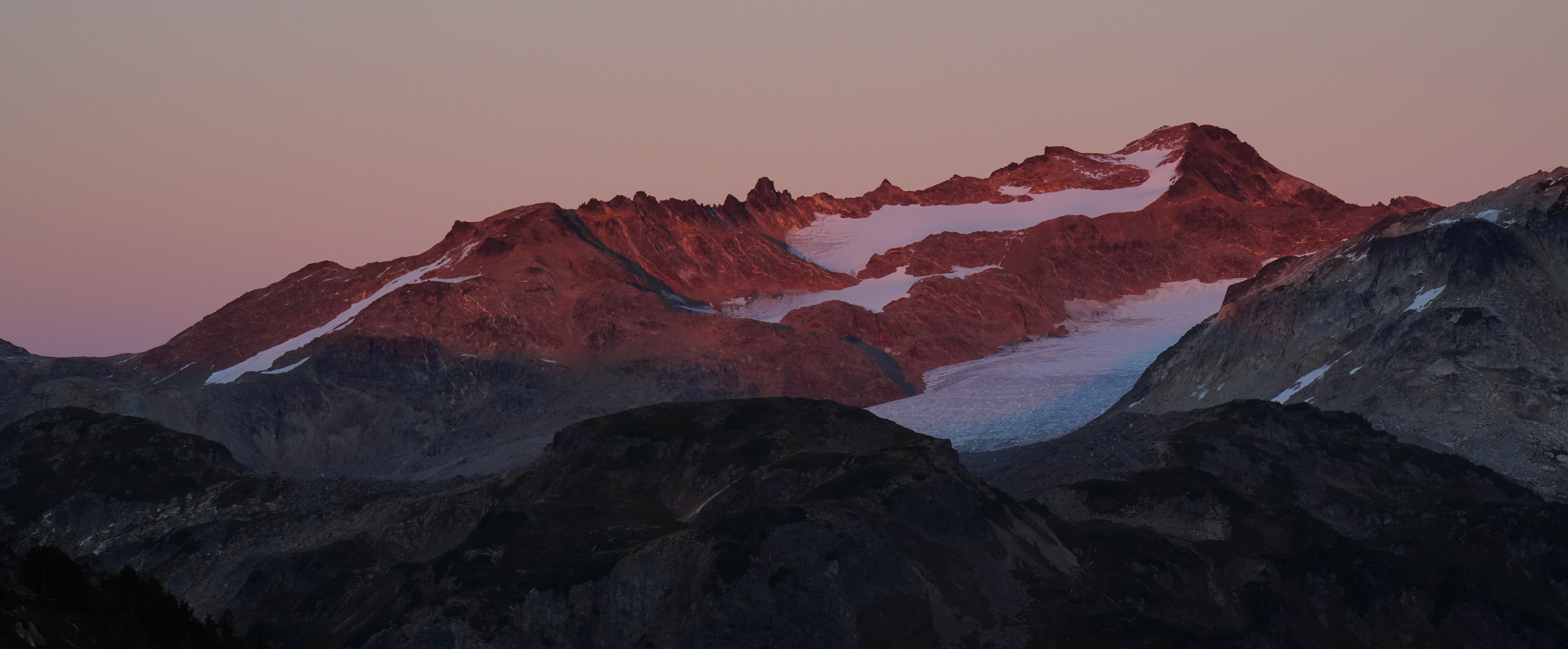
Kololo Peaks alpenglow

== See also ==
- List of mountain peaks of Washington (state)
- Geography of the North Cascades
