= Mazama Lakes =

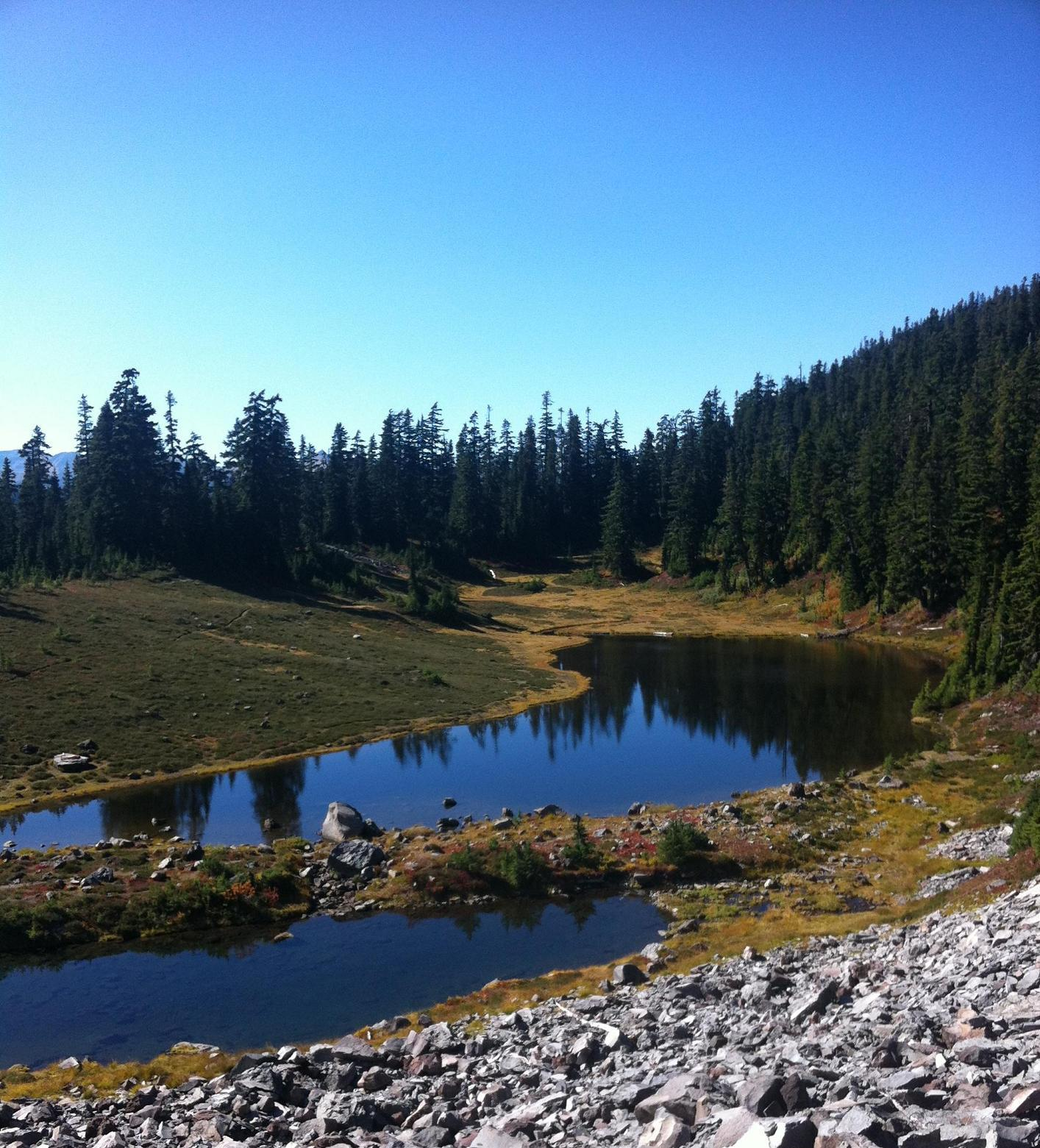
- Mazama Lakes as seen from the Chain Lakes Loop trail.

- Location within Washington (state) Location within the United States
- Location: Whatcom County, Washington
- Coordinates: 48°51′1″N 121°43′22″W
- Type: Glacial Lake
- Basin countries: United States
- Surface elevation: 4,708 ft (1,435 m)
- Islands: 0

Mazama Lakes are twin glacial lakes located in Whatcom County, Washington near Mount Baker. They are a popular area for hiking.

== See also ==
- Mount Baker-Snoqualmie National Forest
- Iceberg Lake, Whatcom County, Washington
