= White Chuck Glacier =

Glacier in Washington, United States

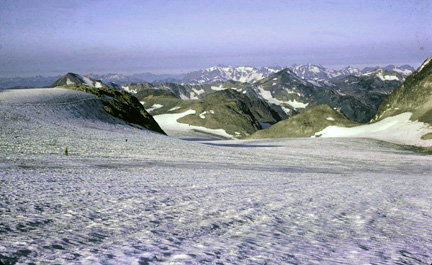
- Northern lobe of White Chuck Glacier as seen in 1973

- Location within Washington (state)
- Type: Mountain glacier
- Location: Glacier Peak Wilderness, Snohomish County, Washington, USA
- Coordinates: 48°03′53″N 121°06′57″W
- Area: .54 sq mi (1.4 km^{2}) in 2005
- Length: .75 mi (1.21 km)
- Terminus: Icefall/Barren Rock
- Status: Retreating

White Chuck Glacier is located in the Glacier Peak Wilderness in the U.S. state of Washington and is 3.5 mi (5.6 km) south of Glacier Peak. The glacier is within Mount Baker-Snoqualmie National Forest and nearly touches the White River Glacier though they are separated by an arête off the Kololo Peaks. White Chuck Glacier has retreated significantly since the end of the Little Ice Age. From about 1850 to 1930, the glacier thinned and by 1940, a fast rate of retreat commenced. By 1955, the glacier had three separate termini and by 2005, the northern terminus was gone. Several small proglacial lakes have been left behind by the retreating glacier. Between 1958 and 2005 White Chuck Glacier lost more than half its surface area.

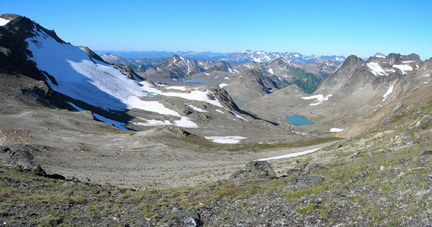
Same vantage point as at right above, in this 2006 image the northern lobe has disappeared

== See also ==
- List of glaciers in the United States
