= Honeycomb Glacier =

Honeycomb Glacier may mean:

- Honeycomb Glacier (Antarctica), a glacier in Antarctica
- Honeycomb Glacier (Washington), a glacier in Washington, USA
