= Painted Mountain =

Mountain in Washington (state), United States

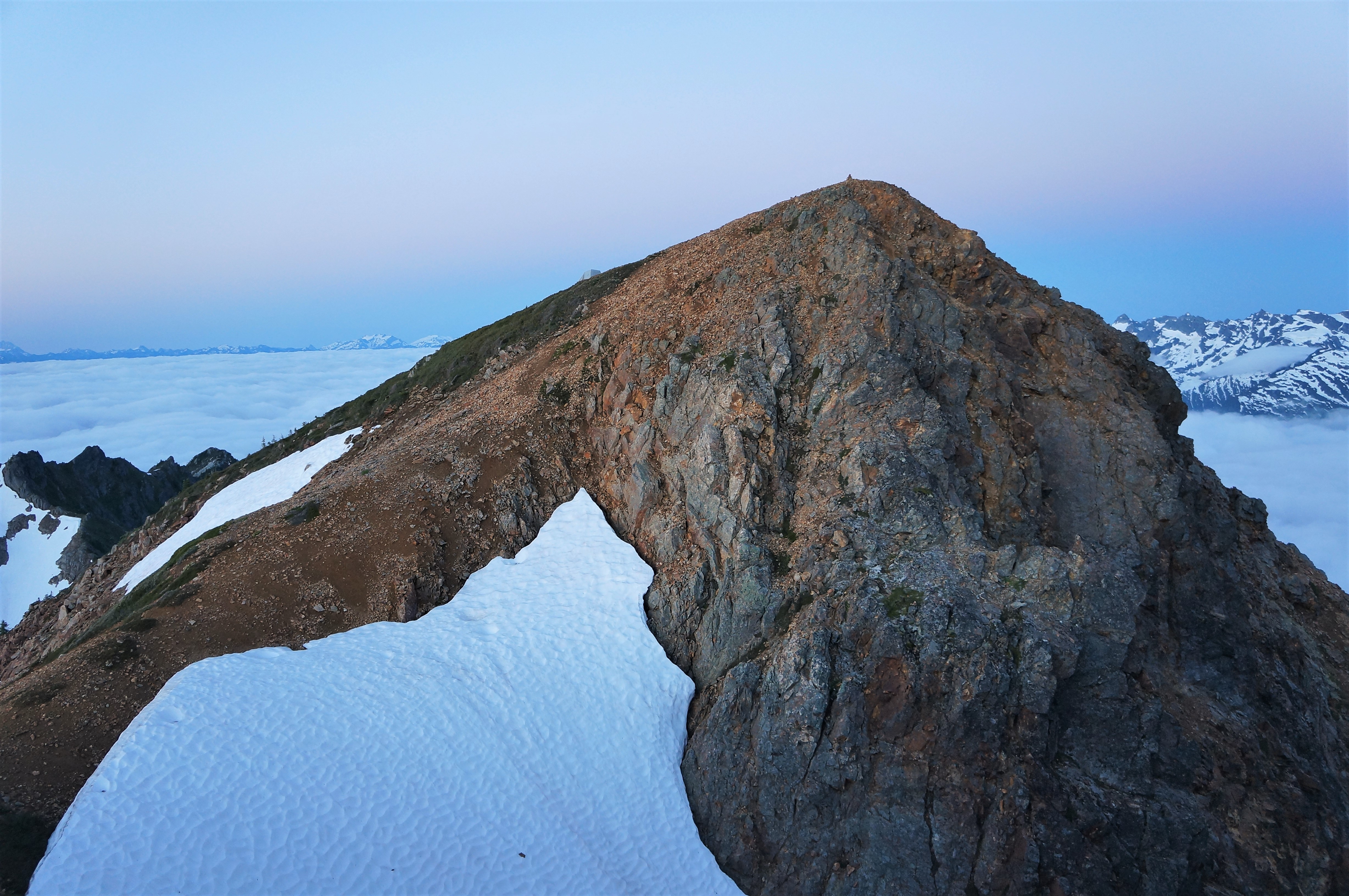
- North aspect

Highest point
- Elevation: 6,975 ft (2,126 m)
- Prominence: 935 ft (285 m)
- Parent peak: Black Mountain (7,262 ft)
- Isolation: 2.23 mi (3.59 km)
- Coordinates: 48°04′28″N 121°15′13″W

Geography
- Location within Washington (state) Location within the United States
- Interactive map of Painted Mountain
- Location: Snohomish County, Washington, U.S.
- Parent range: Cascade Range; North Cascades
- Topo map: USGS Sloan Peak

Geology
- Rock age: Late Cretaceous
- Rock type: Migmatitic Gneiss

Climbing
- First ascent: 1897
- Easiest route: scrambling via southwest shoulder

Painted Mountain is a 6,975-foot-elevation (2,126-meter) summit located in the North Cascades, in Snohomish County of Washington state. The mountain is situated in the Glacier Peak Wilderness on land managed by Mount Baker-Snoqualmie National Forest. Neighbors include line parent Black Mountain, 2.2 mi (3.5 km) to the east, and Glacier Peak is 7 mi (11 km) to the northeast. Precipitation runoff from the peak drains west into tributaries of the North Fork Sauk River. Topographic relief is significant as the summit rises nearly 5,000 feet (1,500 meters) above the river in less than two miles.

== History ==
The first ascent of the summit was likely made in 1897 by a survey team including Sam Strom, who named it "Red Mountain." Subsequently, forest ranger Nels Bruseth applied the Native American name, "Ska-hala-bats" which means painted mountain. This geographical feature's "Painted Mountain" name was officially adopted in 1981 by the U.S. Board on Geographic Names.

== Climate ==
Painted Mountain is located in the marine west coast climate zone of western North America. Most weather fronts originate in the Pacific Ocean, and travel northeast toward the Cascade Mountains. As fronts approach the North Cascades, they are forced upward by the peaks of the Cascade Range, causing them to drop their moisture in the form of rain or snowfall onto the Cascades (Orographic lift). As a result, the west side of the North Cascades experiences high precipitation, especially during the winter months in the form of snowfall. Because of maritime influence, snow tends to be wet and heavy, resulting in avalanche danger. Due to its temperate climate and proximity to the Pacific Ocean, areas west of the Cascade Crest very rarely experience temperatures below 0 °F (−18 °C) or above 80 °F (27 °C). During winter months, weather is usually cloudy, but due to high pressure systems over the Pacific Ocean that intensify during summer months, there is often little or no cloud cover during the summer.

== Geology ==
The North Cascades feature some of the most rugged topography in the Cascade Range with craggy peaks, spires, ridges, and deep glacial valleys. Geological events occurring many years ago created the diverse topography and drastic elevation changes over the Cascade Range leading to the various climate differences.

The history of the formation of the Cascade Mountains dates back millions of years ago to the late Eocene Epoch. With the North American Plate overriding the Pacific Plate, episodes of volcanic igneous activity persisted. Glacier Peak, a stratovolcano that is 7 mi (11 km) northeast of Painted Mountain, began forming in the mid-Pleistocene. In addition, small fragments of the oceanic and continental lithosphere called terranes created the North Cascades about 50 million years ago.

During the Pleistocene period dating back over two million years ago, glaciation advancing and retreating repeatedly scoured the landscape leaving deposits of rock debris. The U-shaped cross section of the river valleys is a result of recent glaciation. Uplift and faulting in combination with glaciation have been the dominant processes which have created the tall peaks and deep valleys of the North Cascades area.

== Gallery ==
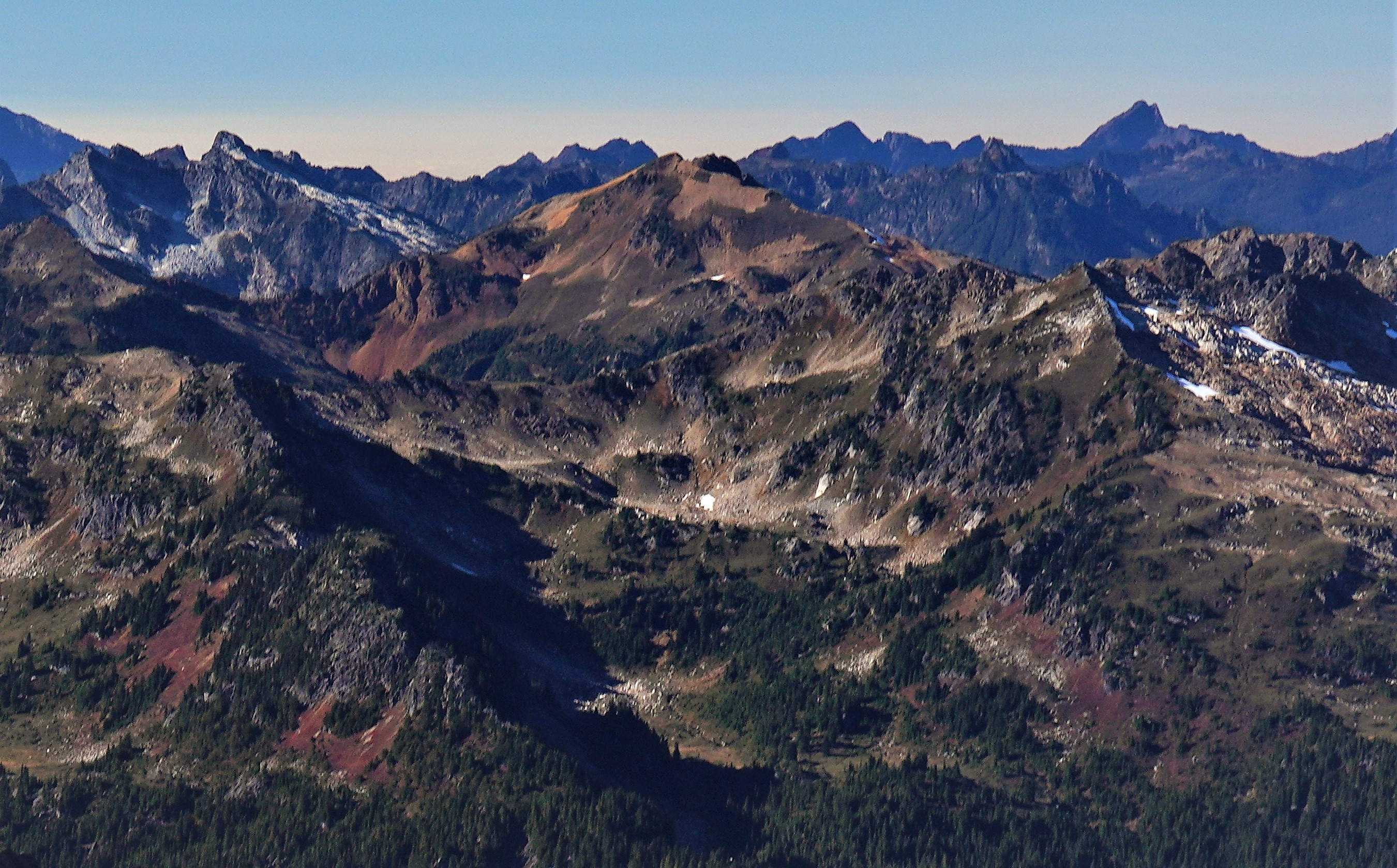
East aspect, centered

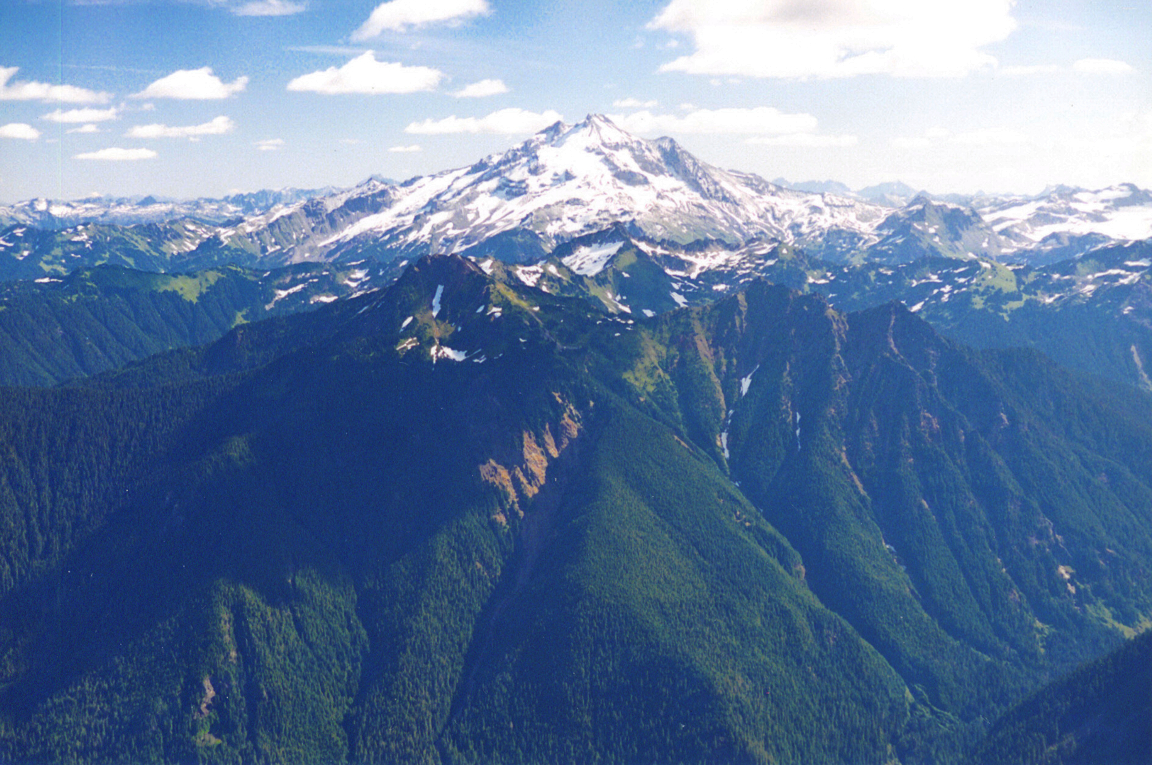
Painted Mountain (left of center, nearest to camera) with Glacier Peak centered at top. Southwest aspect as seen from Sloan Peak in 1999.

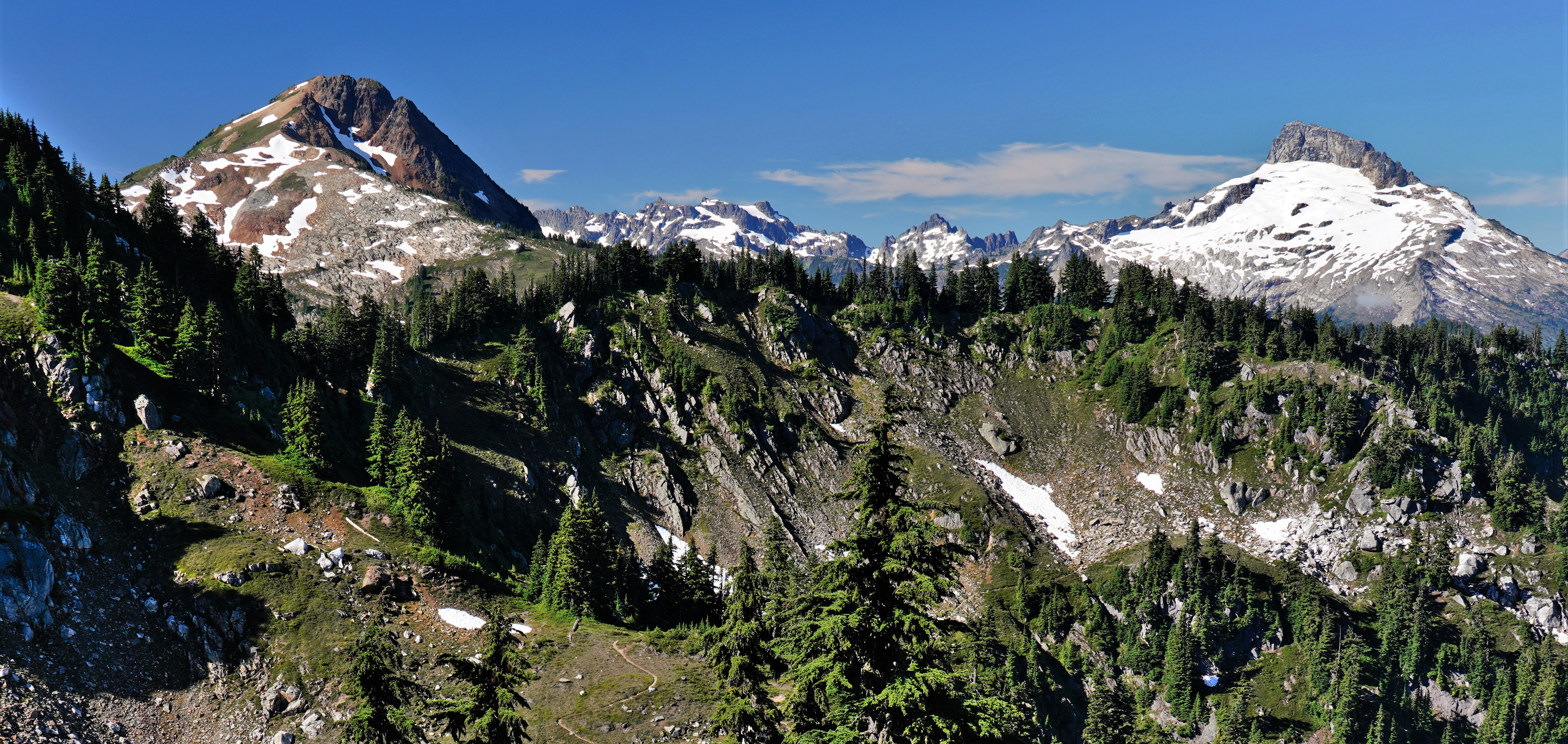
Painted Mountain (left) and Sloan Peak (right)

== See also ==
- Geography of the North Cascades
