= Suiattle River =

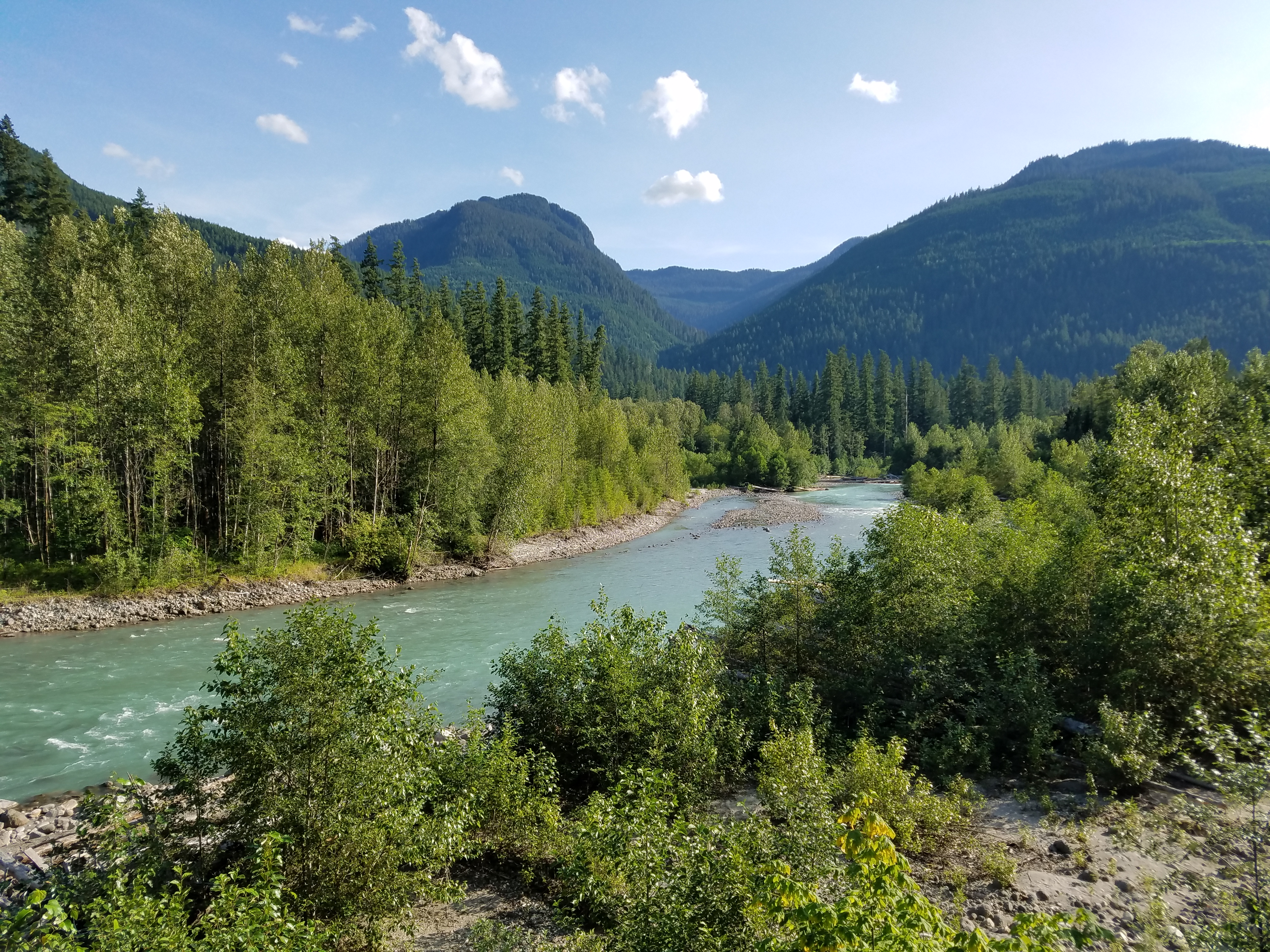
- The Suiattle shortly before its confluence with the Sauk

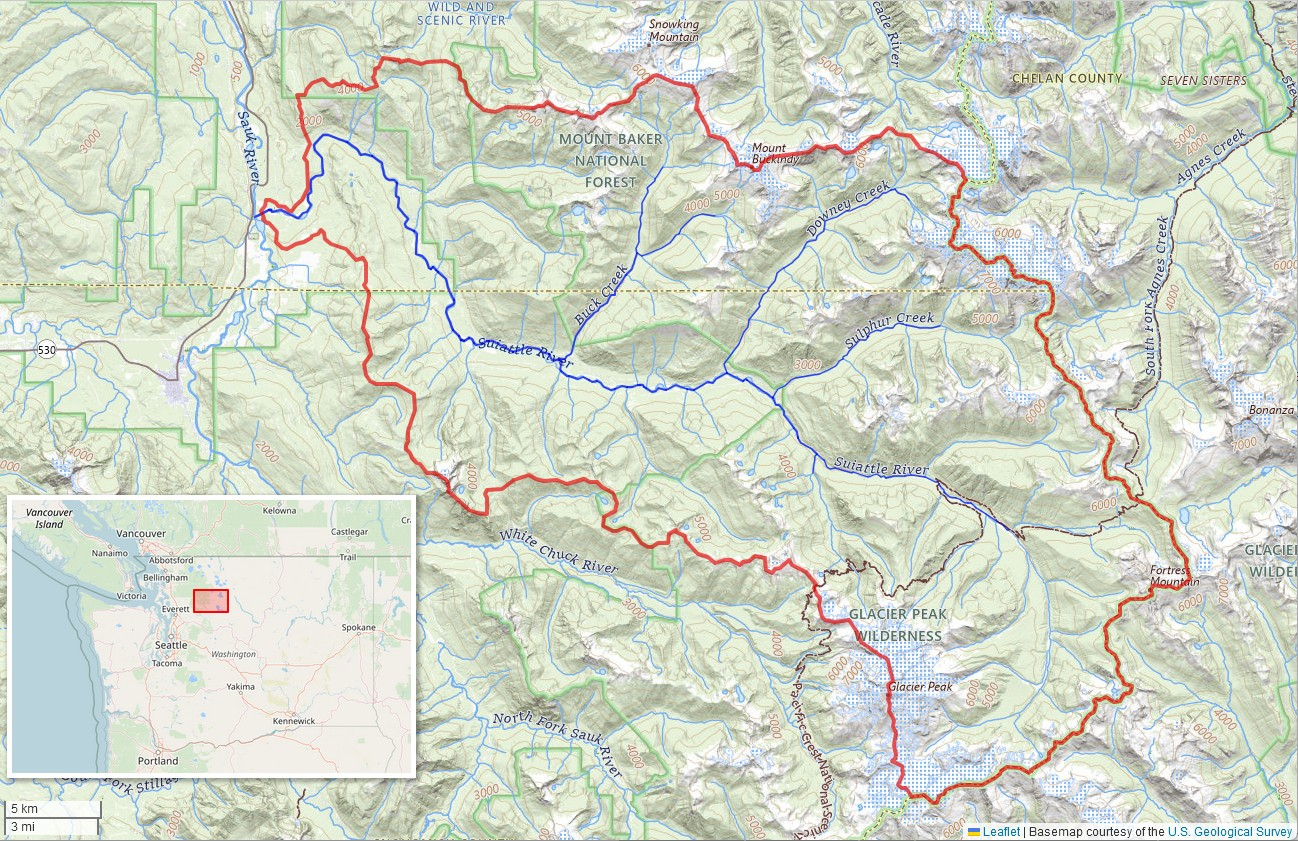
- Suiattle River watershed (Interactive map)

Location
- Country: United States
- State: Washington
- Counties: Skagit, Snohomish

Physical characteristics
- Source: Suiattle Glacier
  - coordinates: 48°4′56″N 121°5′28″W
  - elevation: 7,000 ft (2,100 m)
- Mouth: Sauk River
  - coordinates: 48°20′17″N 121°32′55″W
  - elevation: 400 ft (120 m)
- Length: 60 mi (97 km)
- Basin size: 343.7 sq mi (890 km^{2})
- Discharge
  - average: 1,750 cu ft/s (50 m^{3}/s)
  - minimum: 430 cu ft/s (12 m^{3}/s)
  - maximum: 30,700 cu ft/s (870 m^{3}/s)

National Wild and Scenic River
- Designated: November 10, 1978

The Suiattle River (/suːˈætəl/ soo-AT-əl) is a river in the northern Cascade Mountains of western Washington, United States. It is a tributary of the Sauk River and by extension the Skagit River. Its source is located between Suiattle Glacier and Honeycomb Glacier on Glacier Peak, at an elevation of around 7,000 ft (2,100 m) above sea level. It descends through a 60-mile (97 km) course, lying mainly within the Mount Baker–Snoqualmie National Forest. It meets the Sauk northeast of Darrington, Washington, at an elevation of 400 ft (120 m). Snowmelt from Chocolate and Dusty Glacier gives the river silty water, with a suspended load over twice that of the upper Sauk or adjacent White Chuck.

The Suiattle watershed is heavily forested and undeveloped, with human use mainly limited to outdoor recreation such as the use of the Pacific Crest Trail, which passes over the river. It holds great cultural importance among the eponymous Sauk-Suiattle nation. It is an important spawning site for various species of salmon and trout; the river's stock of Chinook salmon is the only salmon population in the Puget Sound to meet its population recovery targets.

== Course ==
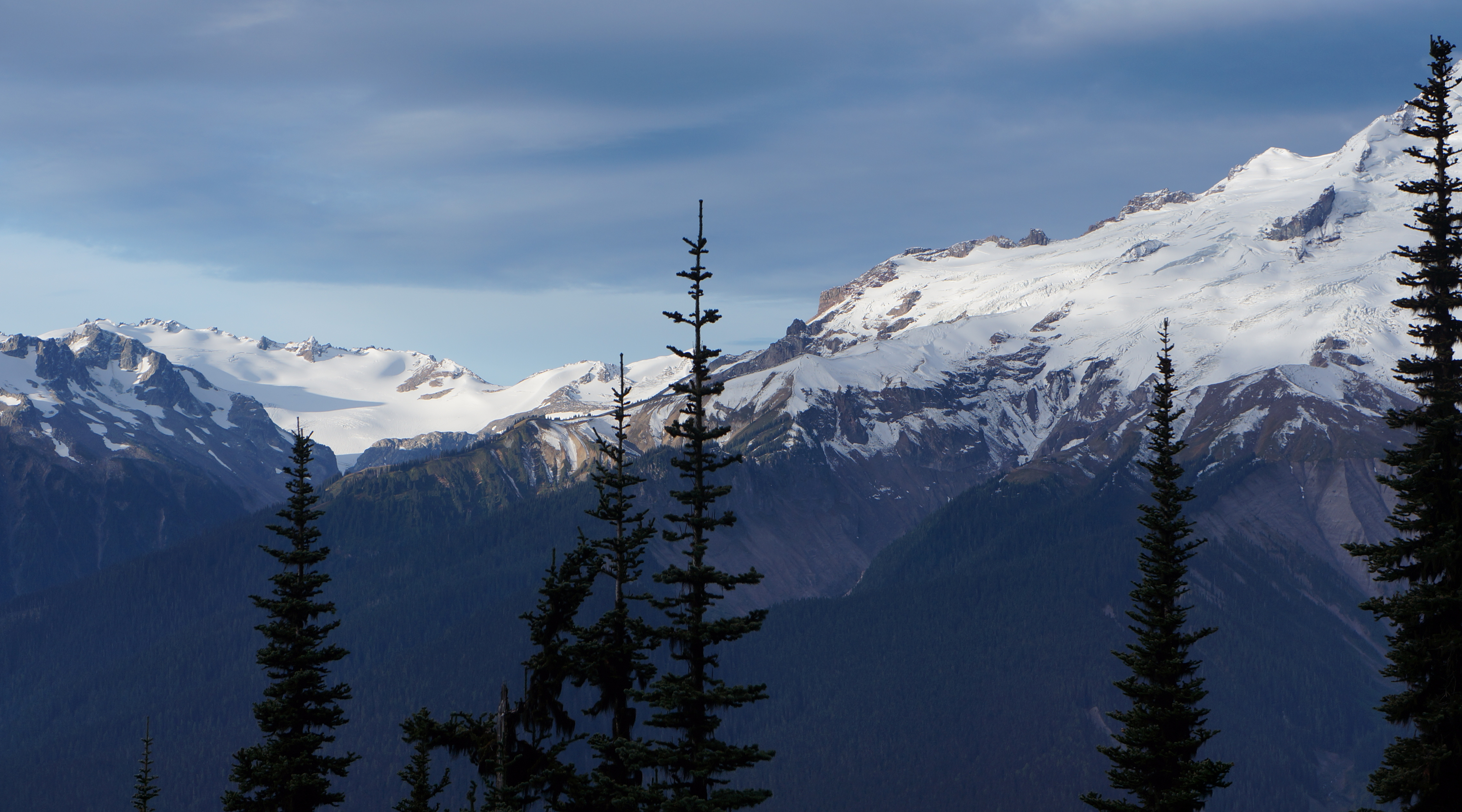
View of Suiattle and Honeycomb Glaciers, the source of the Suiattle River

The Suiattle River is about sixty miles (97 km) in length, flowing mainly westerly from its source on Glacier Peak, one of the highest peaks in the northern Cascades, to its confluence with the Sauk River northeast of Darrington, Washington. Its source lies in Snohomish County, on the southeastern slopes of Glacier Peak, between the Suiattle Glacier and Honeycomb Glacier, where it is fed by high-altitude storms and snowmelt up to 7,000 ft (2,100 m) in elevation. From here, it descends steeply to the northeast, meeting its first named tributary (Chocolate Creek) at around 3,800 ft (1,200 m). The river widens as it flows northward near Fortress Mountain. On its right it takes in Triad, Small, and Miners Creek, while on its left it takes in Dusty, Gamma, and Vista Creek.

The river turns west as it passes Plummer Mountain and Suiattle Pass, taking in Canyon and Dolly Creek. It takes in Milk Creek on its left south of Sulphur Mountain, before briefly curving north and receiving a large number of small tributaries including Downey, Buck, Lime, and Straight Creek. It turns sharply north as it passes into Skagit County east of Prairie Mountain, and receives its last major tributaries, Tenas and Big Creek. It flows south of Suiattle Mountain and makes its confluence with the Sauk between Darrington and Rockport, with its mouth elevation around 400 ft (120 m). From there, the Sauk flows north into the Skagit River, which in turn drains into Puget Sound. The Skagit River system is the largest drainage into the Puget Sound.

== Hydrology ==
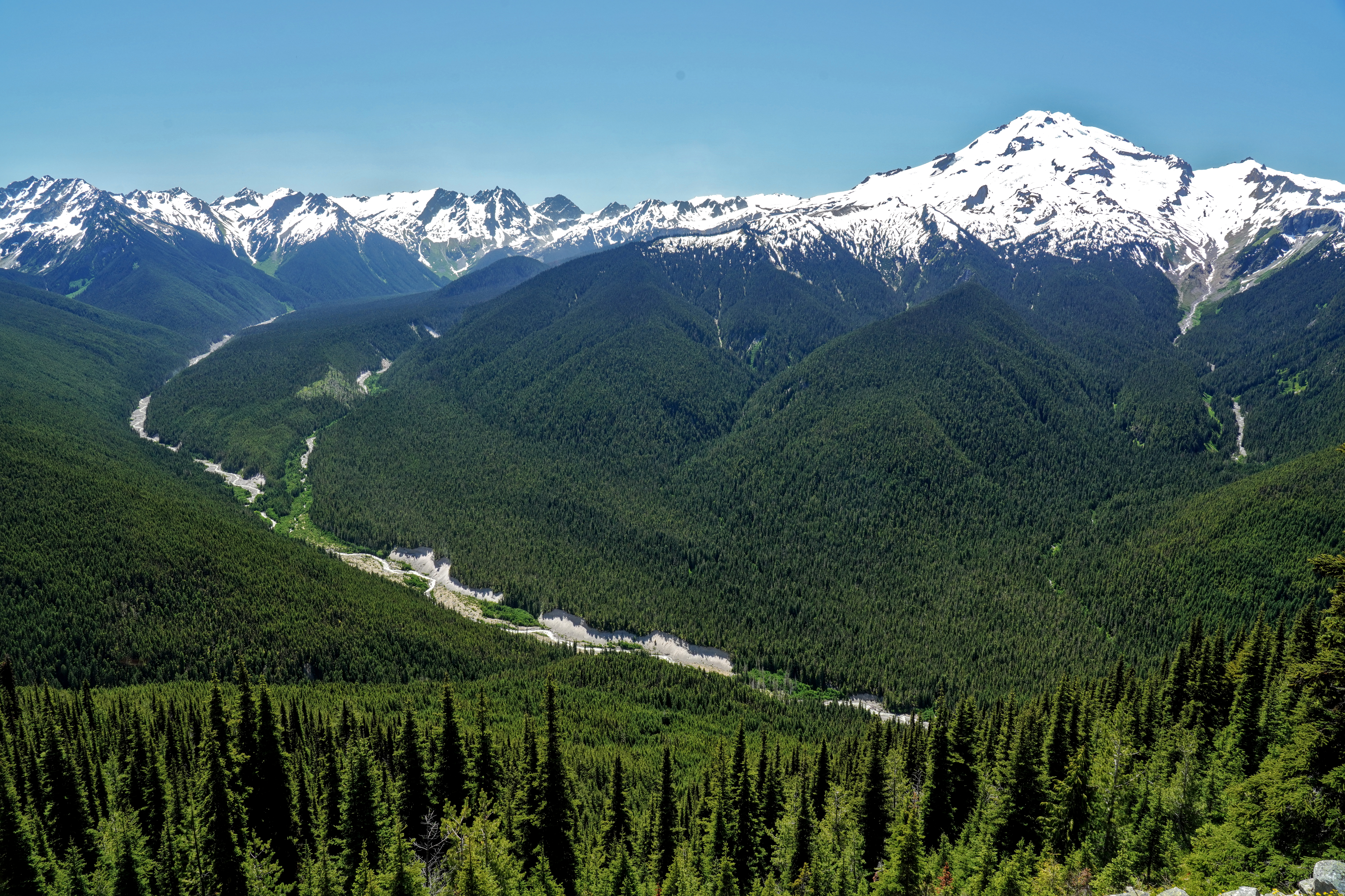
The upper Suiattle valley

The Suiattle drainage basin measures 343.7 sq mi (890 km^{2}) in area, containing around 2,210 miles (3,560 km) of mapped streams.

The Suiattle watershed sees the most rain during the spring and autumn, with a dry summer. The river valley is the driest region of the Darrington Ranger District, as the various surrounding ridges and peaks serve to drain incoming storm systems. Precipitation is lower at its mouth in comparison with higher elevations, measuring 78 in (200 cm) per year as opposed to 150 in (380 cm) at Downey Creek or 170 in (430 cm) at Glacier Peak itself. Between 1,500–3,500 ft (460–1,070 m) in elevation, the river valley enters a transitional snow zone, where winter storms can produce rain or snow depending on temperature variations; this can result in "rain-on-snow" storms where rain melts previous snowfall and creates floods, often the peak flow of a given year. However, the relatively small transitional snow zones on the Suiattle watershed lessen this effect in comparison to other Cascade rivers.

The river valley below the confluence with Downey Creek (around 1,390 ft (420 m) in elevation) only sees occasional snowfall during winter storms. Above 3,500 ft (1,100 m), winter precipitation is consistently snow, creating thick snow layers that persist into June and July at higher elevations. Snowmelt from these accumulations drives high flows during April and May, corresponding to a rapid increase in temperature.

Summer glacial melting gives the Suiattle a consistently high discharge through the year. Summer melt, mainly from Chocolate Glacier and Dusty Glacier, gives the river turbid, silty water, due to the continuous erosion of lahar deposits. This sediment is carried into the Sauk, with around 80% of the Sauk's suspended sediment originating from the Suiattle. As the Skagit River system generally has lower discharge during the summer, silt from the glaciers is visible as far as the Skagit's mouth at the Puget Sound. The total suspended load of the Suiattle is estimated at 680 tons per square kilometer per year, over twice the yields of the adjacent upper Sauk and White Chuck rivers.

== Geology ==
The Suiattle runs along the Straight Creek Fault for a portion of its lower course. During the Last Glacial Period, the Cordilleran ice sheet blocked the flow of the Skagit and Sauk. This produced proglacial lakes, which deposited large amounts of fine clay along the lower Suiattle valley. Later, as glaciers on Glacier Peak receded, coarse outwash was deposited on top of this clay layer, creating soil which lends itself to unstable slopes.

Following the retreat of glacial ice, the Sauk initially flowed into the North Fork of the Stillaguamish River. Glacier Peak underwent an intense eruption around 13,000 years ago, sending large lahars down the Suiattle, White Chuck, and Sauk. This sediment dammed the Sauk near Darrington, rerouting it north into the Skagit. Another major eruption took place around 6,000 years ago, although this did not change the river's course. Smaller lahars have occasionally descended along the river valley over the past 5,000 years; a future lahar from Glacier Peak could potentially revert the Sauk to it earlier course.

== Biology ==
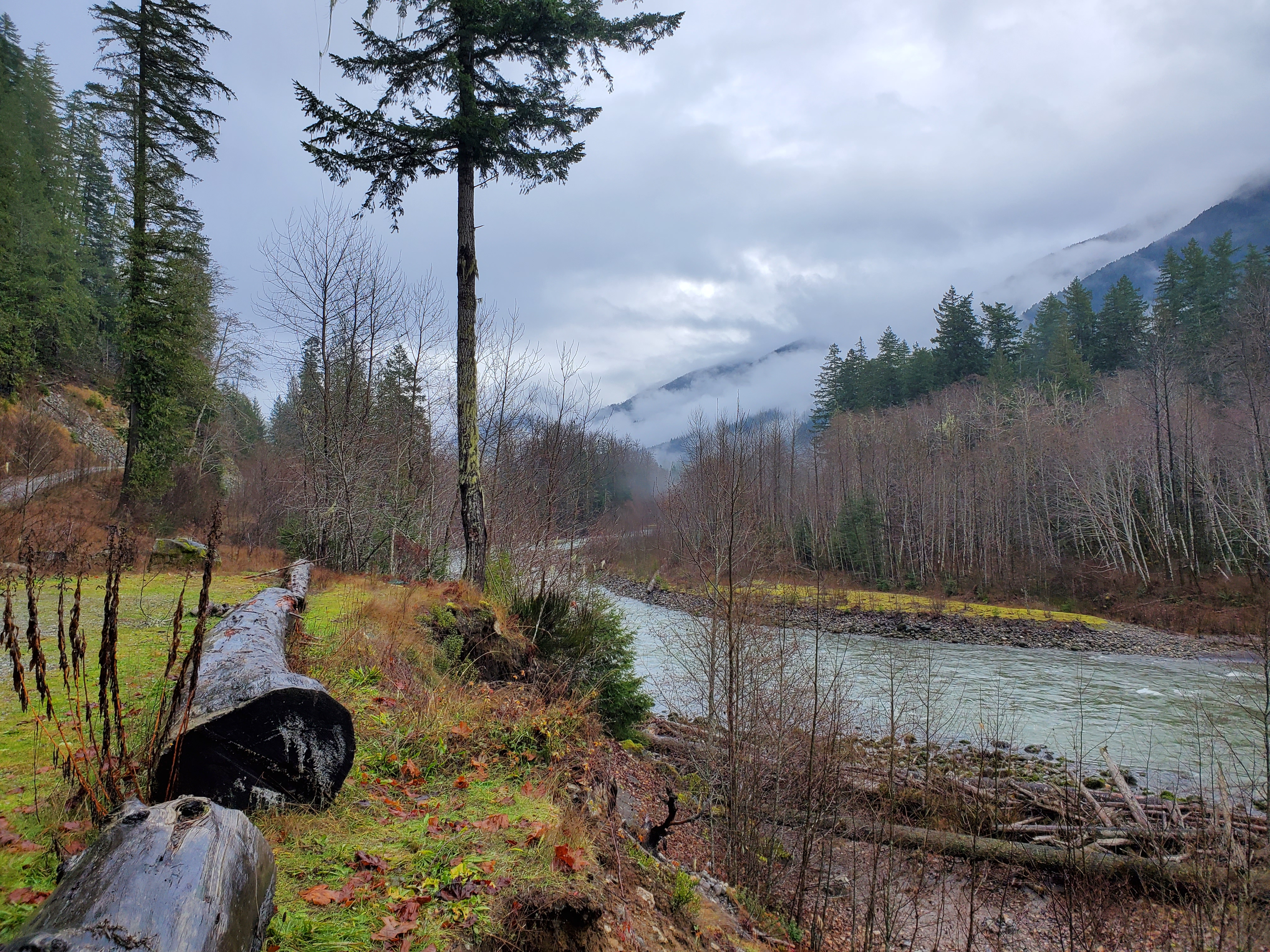
Forest terrain along the bank of the Suiattle

Due to the Suiattle's relatively dry conditions in comparison to other western Cascade river valleys, elevational vegetation zones are shifted upwards. However, silver fir groves are found lower than usual, mostly along tributary streams draining cold air.

Eight species of salmonidae spawn in the Suiattle and its tributary streams. The broader watershed supports a variety of mammal species, including grizzly bears, wolves, wolverines, and martens. Townsend's big-eared bats roost in the river valley. Small numbers of black-tailed deer occupy the watershed, mainly in the upland meadows. Deer populations in the valley fluctuate in response to wildfires and timber harvesting, increasing as tree-clearing allows for greater forage, and decreasing as conifer canopy limits surface plant growth.

A wide variety of birds occupy the river valley. Black swifts are found along waterfalls in the river basin, while hermit warblers, western flycatchers, Hammond's flycatchers, Wilson's warbler, and winter wren are found in adjacent forests. Bald eagles forage along the lower reaches of the river during the winter, where they prey on migrating fish. Pileated woodpeckers are commonly found in old-growth forest along the river.

== Human history ==
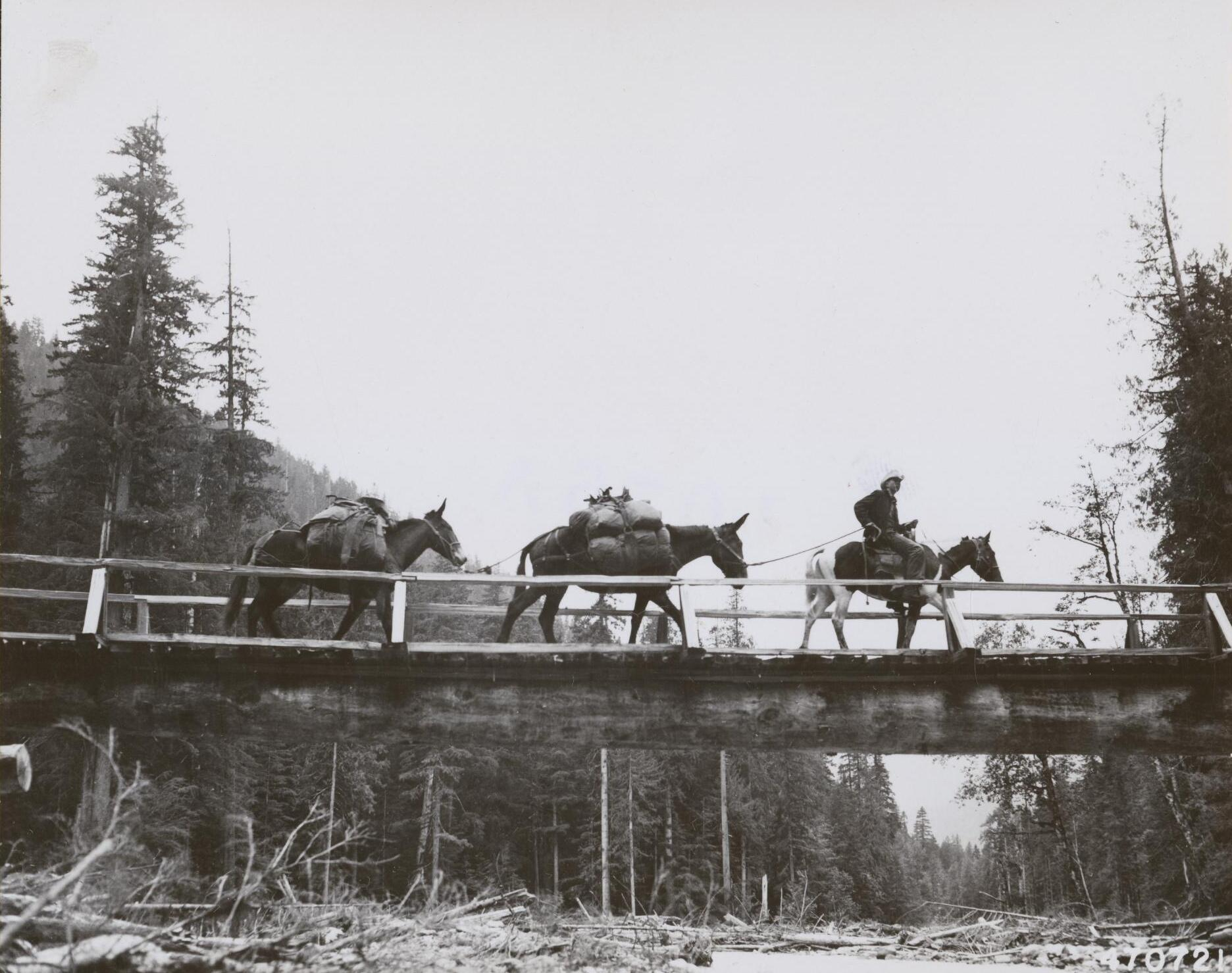
Pack mules crossing the Suiattle, 1905

The Suiattle River was named for the Suiattle (Lushootseed: suyaƛ̕bixʷ), a constituent group of the Sauk-Suiattle tribe. The Sauk and Suiattle people traditionally used the river valley for hunting, salmon fishing, and plant gathering. The Sauk-Suiattle continue to exercise treaty rights and conduct religious ceremonies in the river valley.

The Skagit system, including the Suiattle, was one of the rivers researched as part of the initial Wild and Scenic River studies in 1968. Ten years later, the river was officially put under protection as part of the National Wild and Scenic Rivers System, preventing a variety of previous hydroelectric dam proposals. Despite these protections, the Federal Energy Regulatory Commission approved plans for a dam along the Suiattle in violation of the Wild and Scenic Rivers Act. The American River Conservation Council successfully appealed the ruling in 1983, halting the dam's construction.

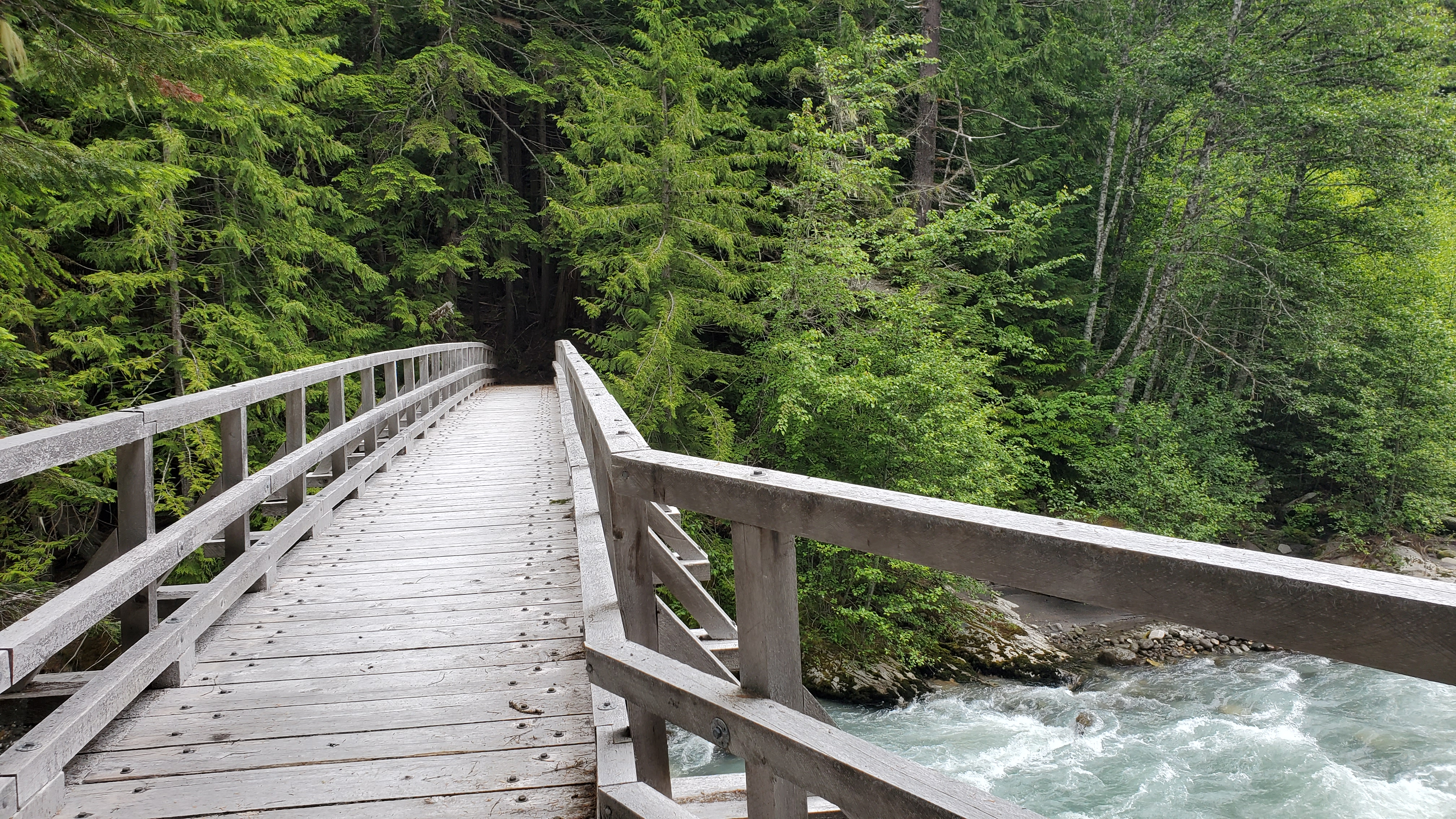
The rebuilt Pacific Crest Trail bridge over the Suiattle

About 94% of the watershed lies within the Darrington Ranger District of Mount Baker–Snoqualmie National Forest, with around 70% in designated wilderness. The Suiattle watershed contains 123 mi (198 km) of trails, including a 31 mi (50 km) portion of the Pacific Crest Trail, which passes across the river at Suiattle River Bridge. The Skyline Bridge, the previous bridge across the river, was destroyed by a storm in 2003, leading to a lengthy detour along the trail. A new 282 ft (86 m) bridge was built in 2011 in a more stable location, adding about 4 mi (6.4 km) to the Pacific Crest Trail route.

The Suiattle River Road runs alongside the river for 22 mi (35 km), with only its first 10 mi (16 km) paved. Flooding in 2003 and 2006 blocked access to the road, which was only reopened in October 2014 after extensive cleanup efforts.

== Ecology ==
The low level of intensive use in the Suiattle basin has led to a lack of water pollution. However, while its contributing streams are generally pristine, riparian degradation including logging has occurred along parts of the main stem. Human modification of the river is limited, although hydromodification via stream bank hardening has been done at four locations along the river, restricting the creation of new river channels and negatively affecting salmon and trout spawning. The confluence of the river with the Sauk is mostly unmodified and dynamic, although it is slightly restricted by the presence of spur roads in the floodplain.

The Suiattle Chinook salmon stock is the only salmon population in the Puget Sound to meet its population recovery targets. These fish mainly spawn in the Suiattle's tributaries from late July to early September.
