= Iceberg Lake (Whatcom County, Washington) =

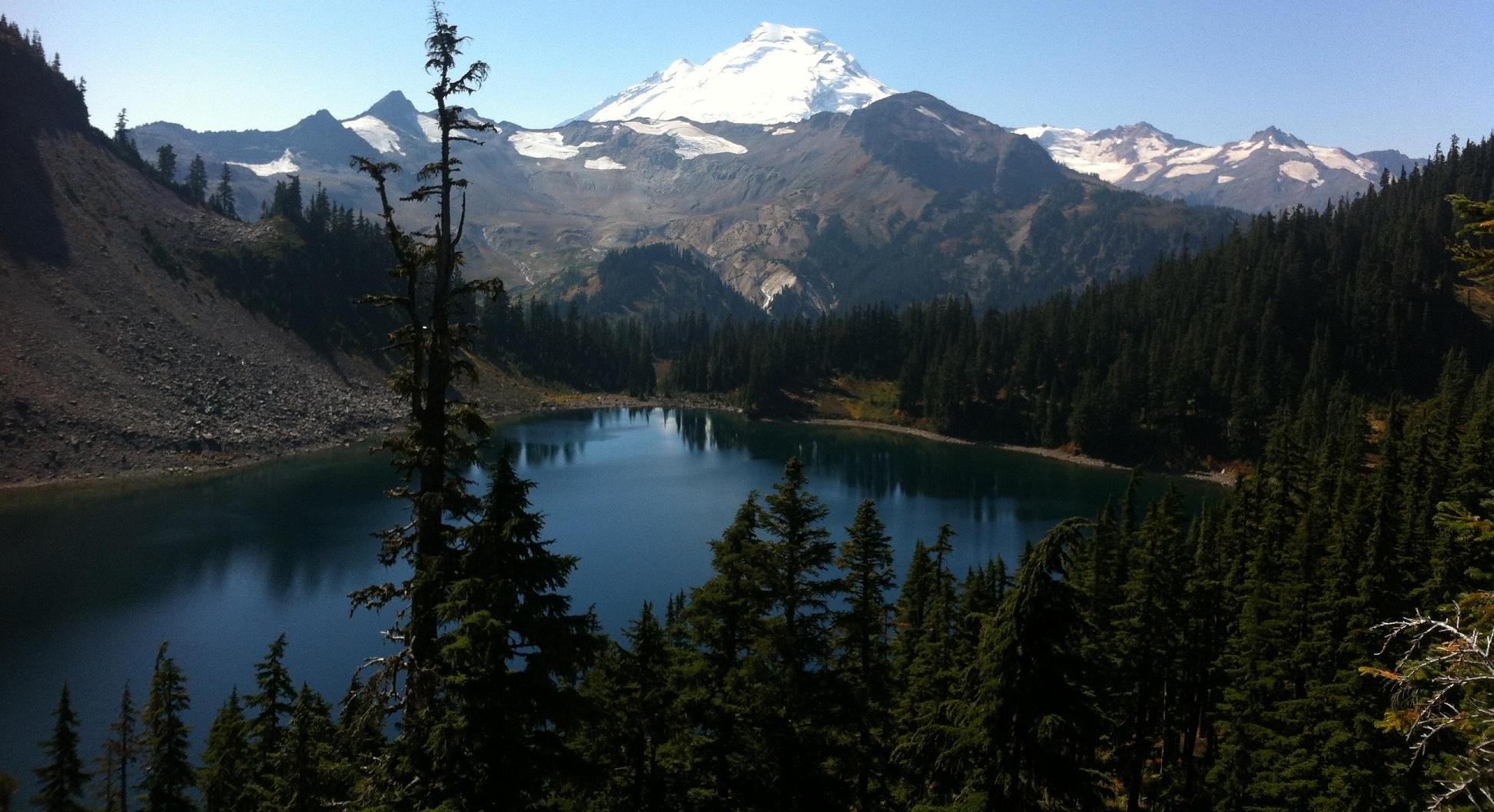
- Iceberg Lake looking toward Mount Baker

- Location within Washington (state) Location within the United States
- Location: Whatcom County, Washington
- Coordinates: 48°51′15″N 121°43′5″W
- Lake type: Glacial lake
- Basin countries: United States
- Surface elevation: 4,797 ft (1,462 m)
- Islands: 0

Iceberg Lake is a glacial lake located in Whatcom County, Washington near Mount Baker. The lake is a popular area for hiking.

== See also ==
- Mazama Lakes
