= Roosevelt Glacier =

Glacier on Mount Baker, Washington State, USA

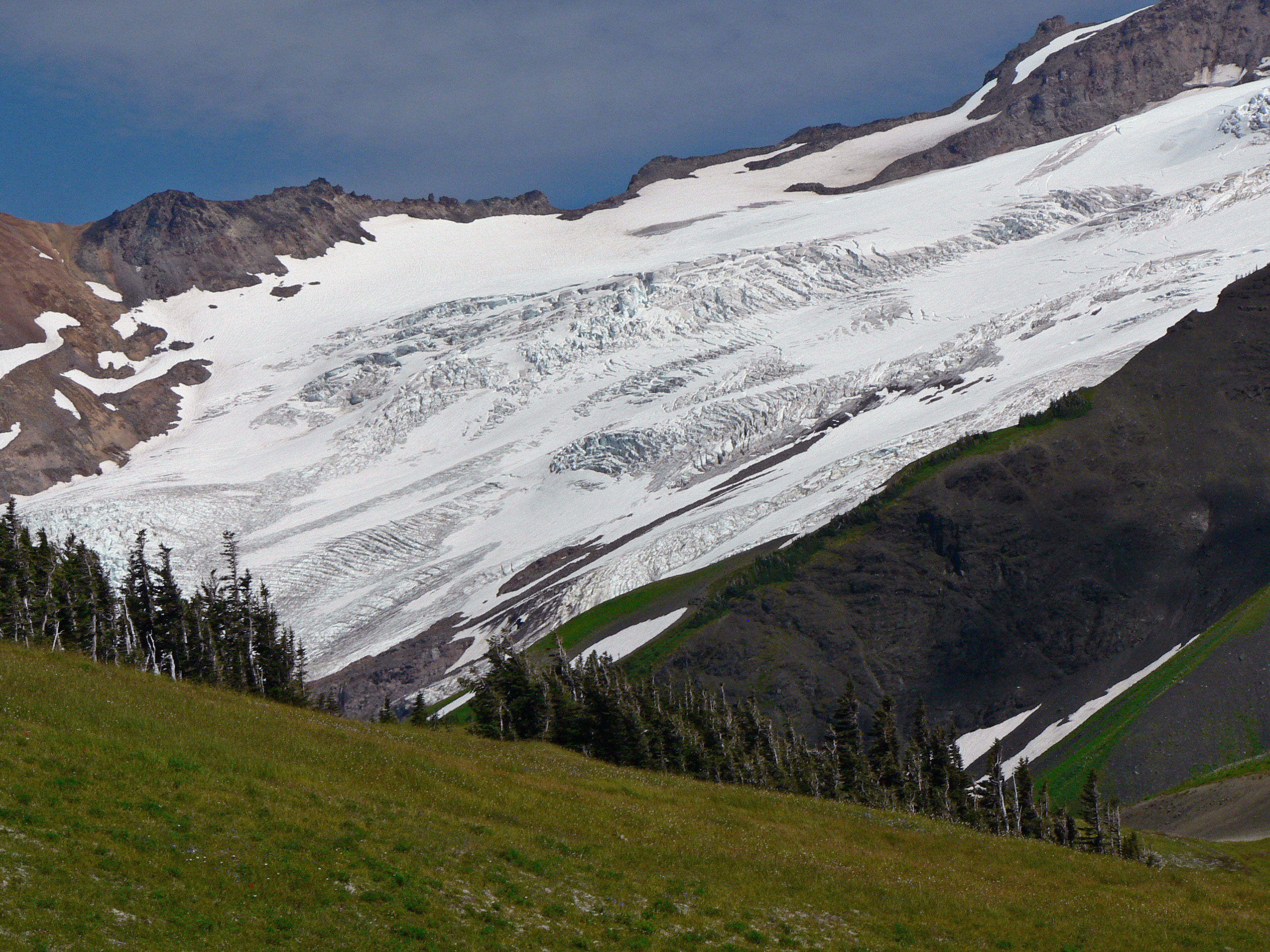

- Location within Washington (state)
- Type: Mountain glacier
- Location: Whatcom County, Washington, USA
- Coordinates: 48°47′25″N 121°49′43″W
- Length: 2 mi (3.2 km)
- Terminus: Icefall/cliffs/talus
- Status: Retreating

Roosevelt Glacier is located on the north slopes of Mount Baker in the North Cascades of the U.S. state of Washington. Roosevelt Glacier descends to nearly 5,000 ft (1,500 m) at Chromatic Moraine. In the middle of its course, Roosevelt Glacier is connected to Coleman Glacier to its south.

Roosevelt Glacier was named for Theodore Roosevelt, who never saw Mount Baker.

== See also ==
- List of glaciers in the United States
