= Coleman Glacier (Washington) =

Glacier in Washington, United States

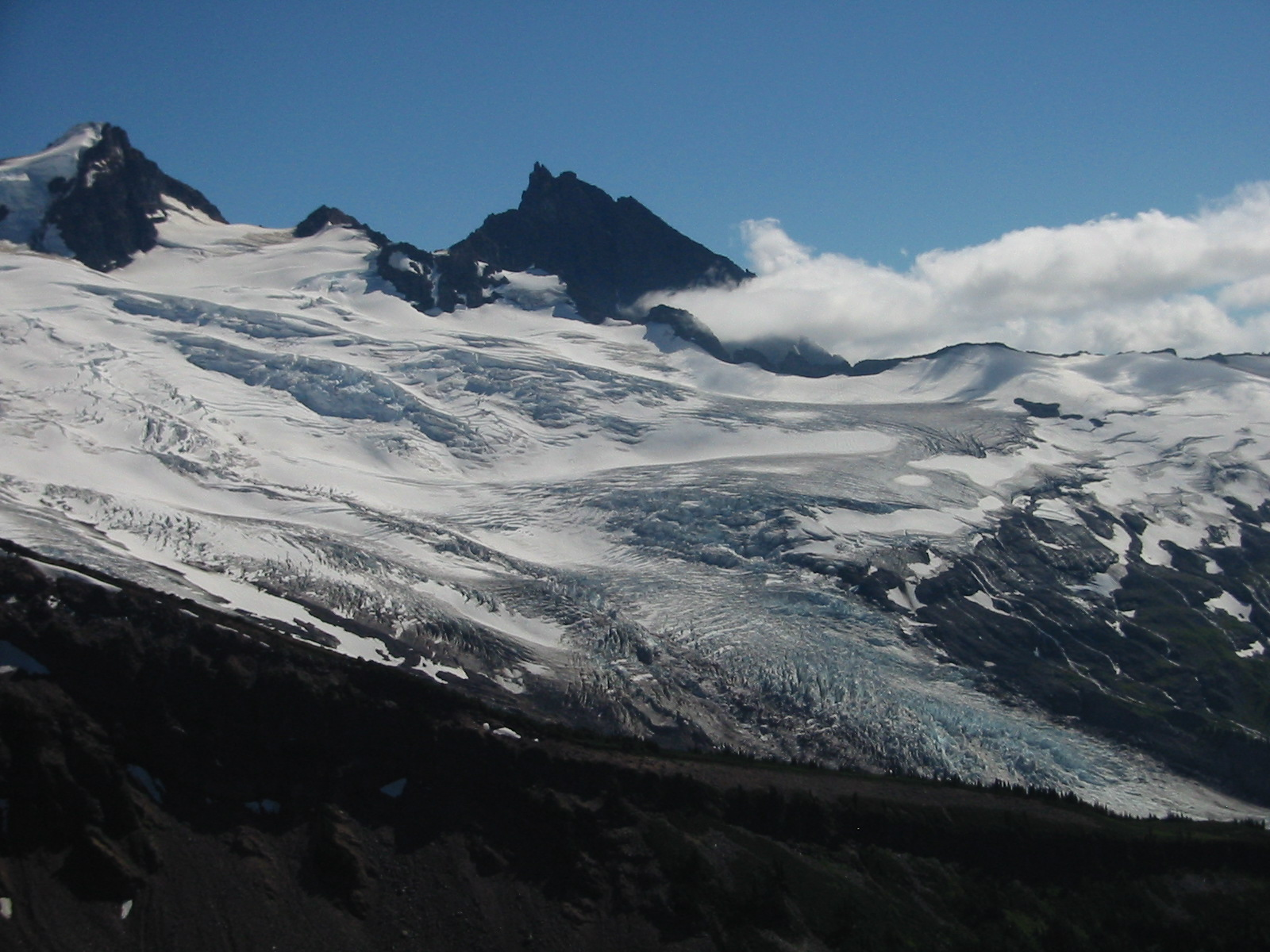
- Coleman Glacier with Colfax Peak (left) and Lincoln Peak (center) behind

- Location within Washington (state)
- Type: Mountain glacier
- Location: Whatcom County, Washington, USA
- Coordinates: 48°46′51″N 121°50′52″W
- Length: 2.25 mi (3.62 km)
- Terminus: Moraine/talus
- Status: Retreating

Coleman Glacier is located on Mount Baker in the North Cascades of the U.S. state of Washington. Between 1850 and 1950, Coleman Glacier retreated 8,200 ft (2,500 m). During a cooler and wetter period from 1950 to 1979, the glacier advanced 2,480 ft (760 m) but between 1980 and 2006 retreated back 1,443 ft (440 m). Situated on the west slopes of Mount Baker, Coleman Glacier is bordered by the Roosevelt Glacier to the north and the Heliotrope Ridge to the south.

Coleman Glacier was named for Edmund Thomas Coleman, who was part of the first mountaineering team to climb Mount Baker in 1868.

== See also ==
- List of glaciers in the United States
