= Suiattle Glacier =

Glacier in the United States

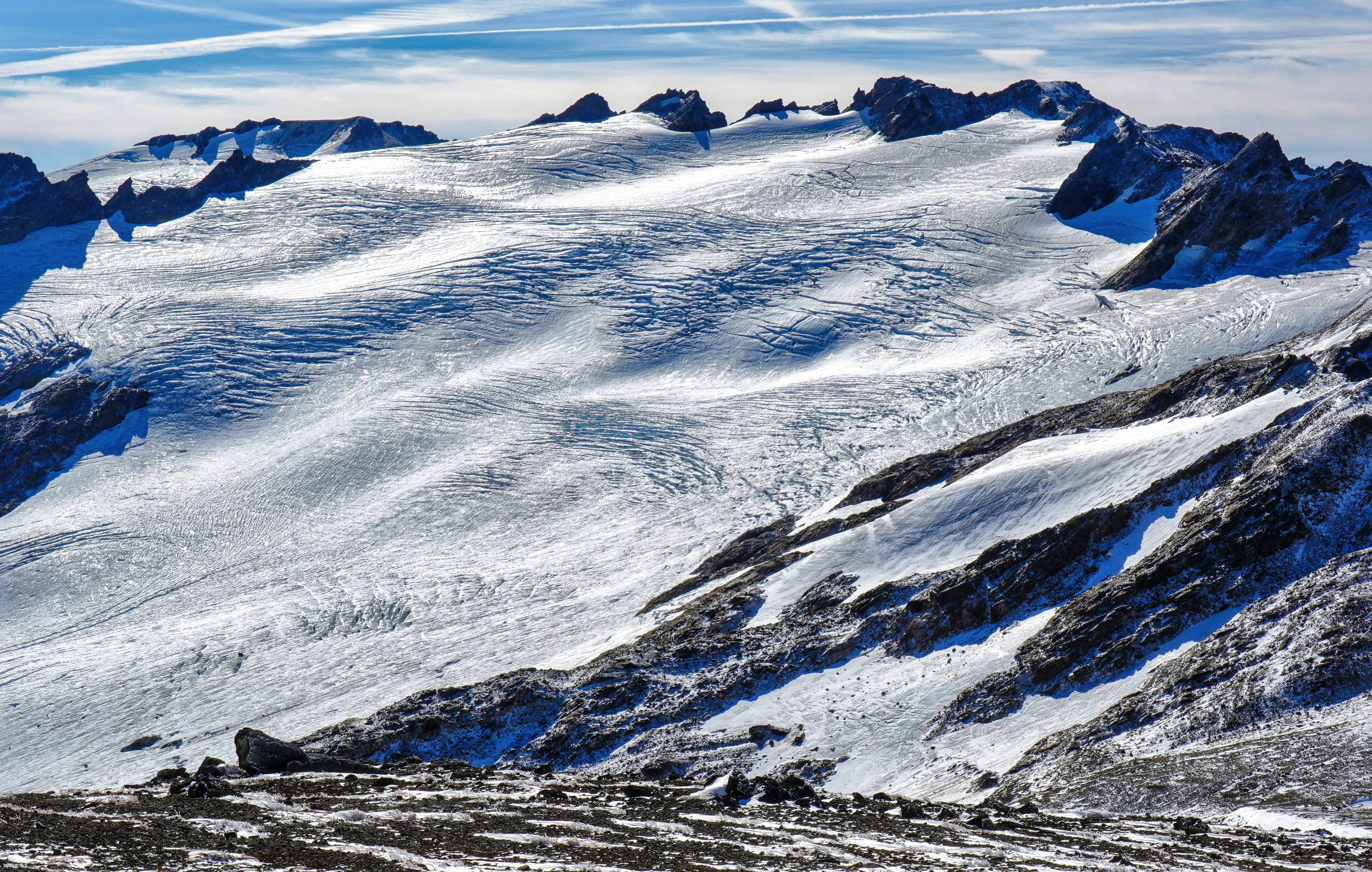

- Location within Washington (state)
- Type: Mountain glacier
- Location: Glacier Peak Wilderness, Snohomish County, Washington, USA
- Coordinates: 48°04′18″N 121°05′46″W
- Length: 1.25 mi (2.01 km)
- Terminus: Icefall/Barren Rock
- Status: Retreating

Suiattle Glacier is located in the Glacier Peak Wilderness in the U.S. state of Washington. The glacier is within Mount Baker-Snoqualmie National Forest and nearly touches Honeycomb and White River glaciers separated from them by an arête off the Kololo Peaks at its uppermost reaches. Suiattle Glacier has retreated significantly since the end of the Little Ice Age, and from approximately the years 1850 to 1924 lost 1,400 m (4,600 ft) of its length. Between 1924 and 1940, the glacier retreated an additional 900 m (3,000 ft), then during a cooler and wetter period between 1967 and 1979, the glacier had a small advance of 20 m (66 ft). After this, Suiattle Glacier began to retreat again and has retreated 270 m (886 ft) from its advanced position in the 1970s to 2009.

== See also ==
- List of glaciers in the United States
