= White River Glacier (Washington) =

Glacier in Washington, United States

- Location within Washington (state)
- Type: Mountain glacier
- Location: Glacier Peak Wilderness, Chelan County, Washington, USA
- Coordinates: 48°03′27″N 121°05′48″W
- Length: .70 mi (1.13 km)
- Terminus: Icefall/Barren Rock
- Status: Retreating

White River Glacier is located in the Glacier Peak Wilderness in the U.S. state of Washington. The glacier is within Wenatchee National Forest and nearly touches Honeycomb and Suiattle Glaciers, separated from them by an arête off the Kololo Peaks at its uppermost reaches. White River Glacier has retreated approximately 1,000 m (3,300 ft) since the end of the Little Ice Age around the year 1850.

== See also ==
- List of glaciers in the United States
