= Honeycomb Glacier (Washington) =

Glacier in Washington, United States

- Location within Washington (state)
- Type: Mountain glacier
- Location: Glacier Peak Wilderness, Snohomish County, Washington, USA
- Coordinates: 48°04′28″N 121°03′38″W
- Area: 1.31 sq mi (3.4 km^{2})
- Length: 2.48 mi (3.99 km)
- Terminus: Proglacial Lake/Talus
- Status: Retreating

Honeycomb Glacier is located in the Glacier Peak Wilderness in the U.S. state of Washington. The glacier is mainly in Mount Baker-Snoqualmie National Forest, but a small segment near the top of the glacier extends into Wenatchee National Forest. Honeycomb Glacier is nearly connected to White River and Suiattle Glaciers and is separated from them by an arête off the Kololo Peaks.

Honeycomb Glacier is one of the largest glaciers found in the North Cascades, but since the end of the Little Ice Age (around the year 1850), it retreated 1.08 mi (1.74 km) between then and the year 2005. More than a quarter of the retreat happened between 1979 and 2005, suggesting that the rate of recession has been increasing.

== See also ==
- List of glaciers in the United States
