= Mount Baker–Snoqualmie National Forest =

Protected area in the United States

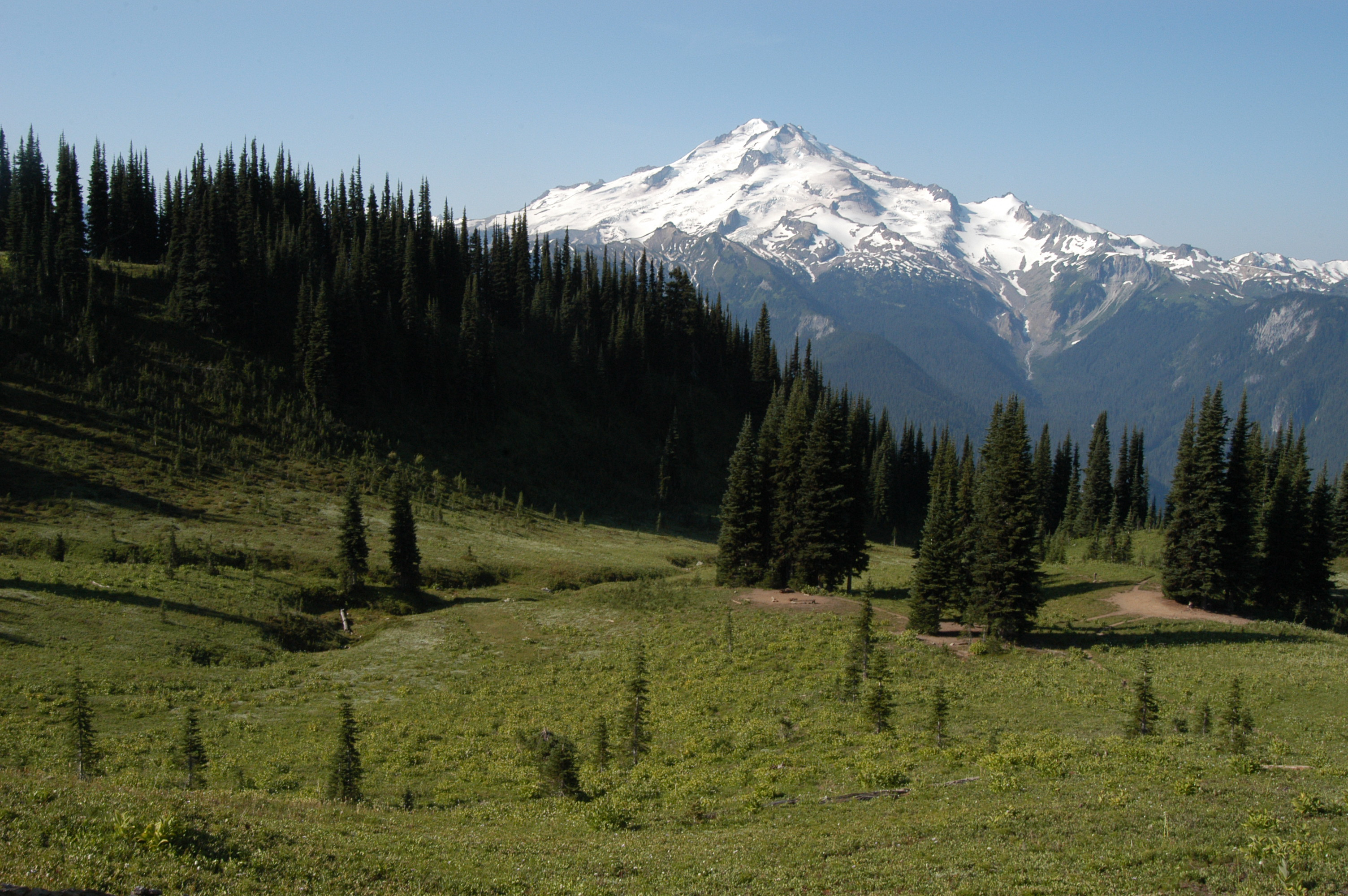
- Glacier Peak from Image Lake
- Location: Washington, U.S.
- Coordinates: [type:landmark_dim:87km 47°45′58″N 121°22′41″W
- Area: 1,724,229 acres (6,977.71 km^{2})
- Established: 1974; Snoqualmie National Forest: July 1, 1908; Mount Baker National Forest: January 21, 1924
- Governing body: U.S. Forest Service
- Website: Mount Baker–Snoqualmie National Forest

The Mount Baker–Snoqualmie National Forest is a National Forest in Washington extending more than 140 miles (230 km) along the western slopes of the Cascade Range from the Canada–US border to the northern boundary of Mount Rainier National Park. It is administered by the United States Forest Service, with the forest's headquarters in South Everett. Local ranger district offices are located in Sedro-Woolley, Darrington, Skykomish, North Bend and Enumclaw.

== History ==
Mount Baker National Forest was established as the Washington Forest Reserve on February 22, 1897, with 3,594,240 acres (14,545.4 km^{2}). It became a national forest on March 4, 1907, and was renamed as Mount Baker National Forest on January 21, 1924. Snoqualmie National Forest was established from land in Washington NF on 1 July 1908 with 961,120 acres (3,889.52 km^{2}). A part of Rainier National Forest was added on October 19, 1933. The two were administratively combined in 1974.

The 1935 version of The Call of the Wild, starring Clark Gable, Loretta Young and Jack Oakie, was filmed on location in Mount Baker National Forest. Twentieth Century Pictures believed the location was remote enough to guarantee lack of interruption from skiers and other forest visitors. Paramount Pictures later filmed The Barrier (1937) at Mount Baker Lodge.

== Visitation ==
The Mount Baker–Snoqualmie National Forest covers (in descending order of forestland area) portions of Snohomish, Whatcom, Skagit, King, Pierce, and Kittitas counties. It has a total area of 1,724,229 acres (6,978 km^{2}). The forest consists of four ranger districts. The following are listed geographically from north to south: the Mount Baker District has two ranger stations, located in Glacier and Sedro-Woolley; the Darrington Ranger District has two ranger stations, located in Darrington and Verlot; the Skykomish Ranger District has one ranger station located in Skykomish; and the Snoqualmie Ranger District has two ranger stations, located in North Bend and Enumclaw.

Together with the other central Puget Sound counties, 62% (3.63 million people) of the state's population live within a 70-mile (110 km) drive of the forest. Another 1.5 million in the Vancouver metropolitan area are also within easy reach of the northern part of the forest. The large population, coupled with easy road access, has resulted in the Mount Baker–Snoqualmie National Forest being the most visited national forest in the country.

== Geography ==
=== Mountains ===
The Mount Baker–Snoqualmie National Forest contains many scenic and historical points of interest. Mountain tops gradually rise from 5,000 to 6,000 feet (1,500 to 1,800 m) on the south end of the forest to 7,000 to 8,000 feet (2,100 to 2,400 m) in the north. Two tall volcanoes, Mount Baker and Glacier Peak, tower thousands of feet above the adjacent ridges.

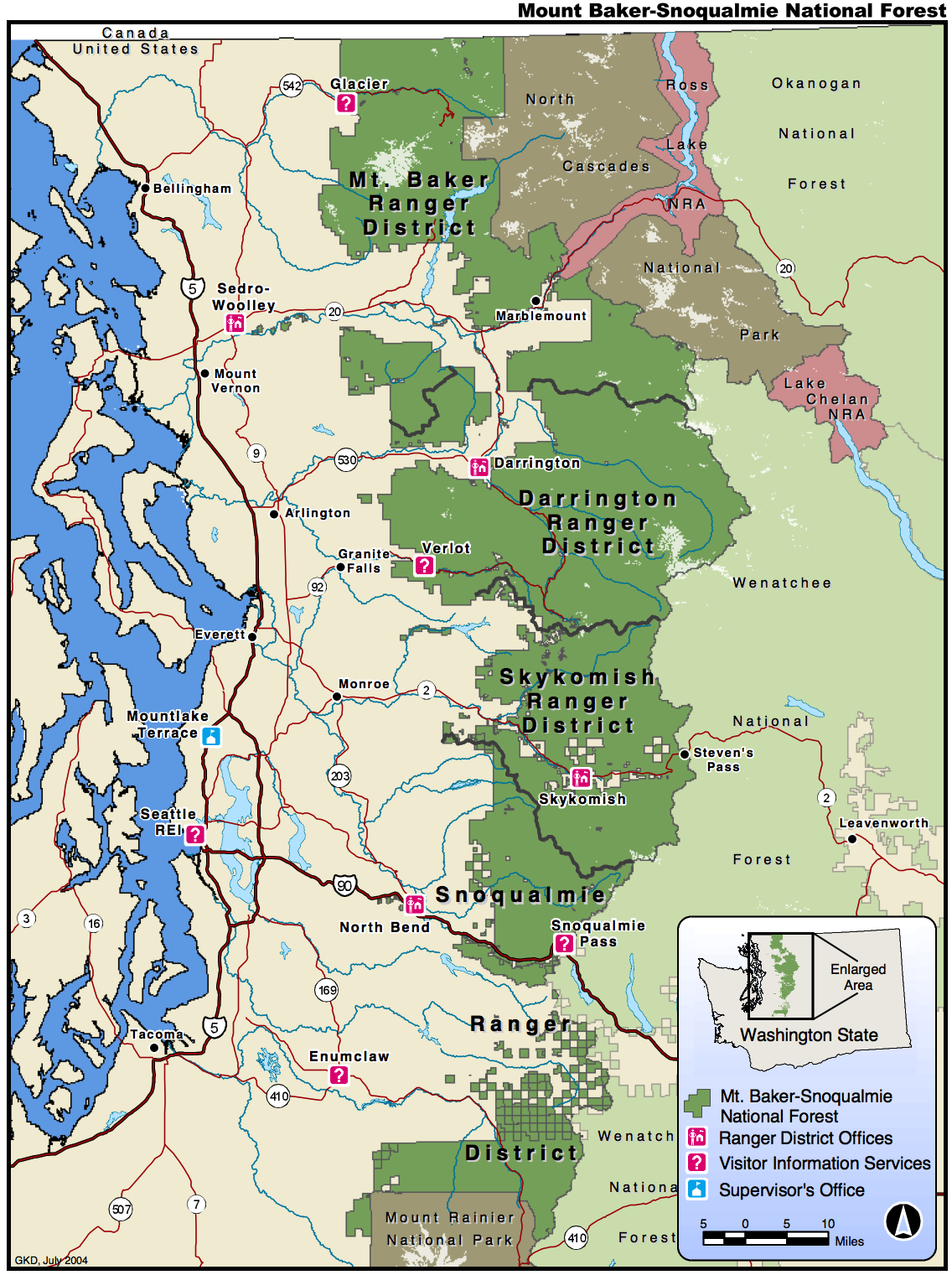
Map of the Mount Baker–Snoqualmie National Forest

=== Glaciers ===
The forest is home to more glaciers and snow fields than any other national forest outside Alaska. As of 1971, the largest glaciers—with surface areas greater than 2.5 km^{2} (0.97 sq mi)—are:

- Mount Baker
  - Roosevelt
  - Mazama
  - Park
  - Boulder
  - Easton
  - Deming
  - Coleman
- Sentinel Peak
  - South Cascade Glacier
- Glacier Peak
  - Suiattle
  - Honeycomb
  - White Chuck

The number of glaciers in the forest has decreased from 295 in 1971 to fewer than 287 in 1998. This is a part of the global phenomenon of glacier retreat. Forest glaciers have lost between 20 and 40% of their volume between 1984 and 2006. This is due to continued warm conditions from climate change and negative mass balance.

White Chuck Glacier (Glacier Peak) is no longer on the list of large glaciers, above. It shrank from 3.1 to 0.9 km^{2} (1.20 to 0.35 sq mi) from 1958 to 2002. With the shrinking of the glaciers, summer glacial runoff has been reduced by 65 to 80%. This reduces streamflow and sediment and increases water temperature. Salmon and many other species are adversely affected by such changes.

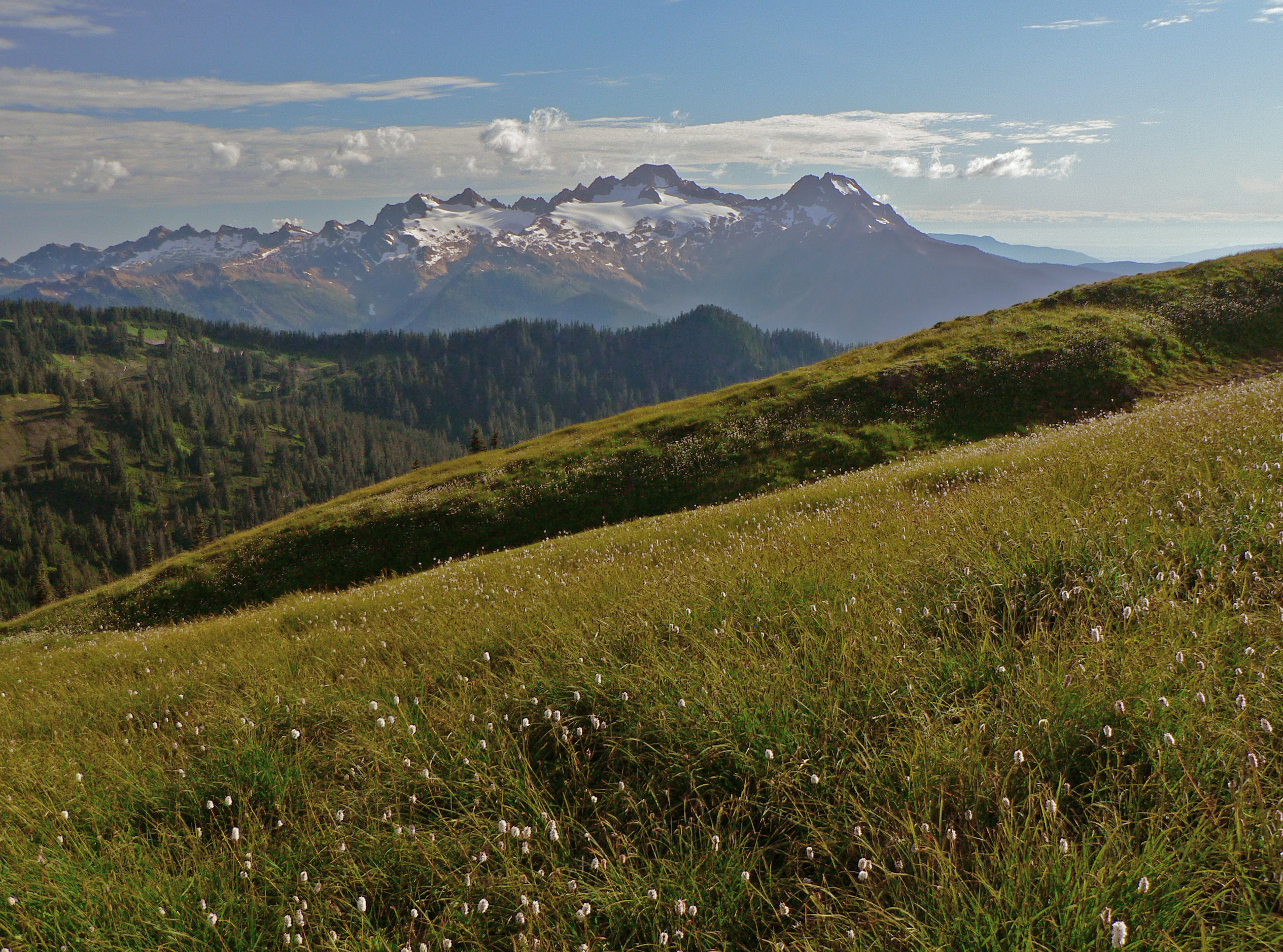
Twin Sisters Mountain in the Mount Baker Wilderness

== Conservation ==
The north and east portions of the forest are exceptionally rugged and scenic. In 1968, part of the forest was transferred to the National Park Service to be within North Cascades National Park. A 1993 Forest Service study estimated that the extent of old growth in the forest was 643,500 acres (260,400 ha).

In addition, Congressional action since 1964 has established the following wilderness areas, which comprise 827,101 acres (3,347 km^{2})—almost half of the forest's area:

- Alpine Lakes Wilderness (mostly in Wenatchee NF)
- Boulder River Wilderness
- Clearwater Wilderness
- Glacier Peak Wilderness (partly in Wenatchee NF)
- Henry M. Jackson Wilderness (partly in Wenatchee NF)
- Mount Baker Wilderness
- Noisy-Diobsud Wilderness
- Norse Peak Wilderness
- Pasayten Wilderness (mostly in Okanogan NF)
- Wild Sky Wilderness

These pristine areas provide clean water, solitude, and permanent protection to old-growth forests across 42% of the Mount Baker–Snoqualmie National Forest.

Congress also established the Skagit Wild and Scenic River System in 1978. Its 125 miles (201 km) of rivers on the Skagit, Cascade, Sauk, and Suiattle rivers provide important wildlife habitat and recreation. The Skagit River System is home to one of the largest winter populations of bald eagles in the United States.

The Mount Baker–Snoqualmie National Forest encompasses much of the North Cascades ecoregion, a Level III North American Ecoregion. It includes the following level IV ecoregions:

- Western Hemlock Ecoregion
- Silver Fir Ecoregion
- Subalpine Mountain Hemlock Ecoregion
- Alpine Ecoregion

== See also ==
- List of national forests of the United States
