= Kelly-Springfield Motor Truck Co. Building =

Building in Seattle, Washington, U.S.

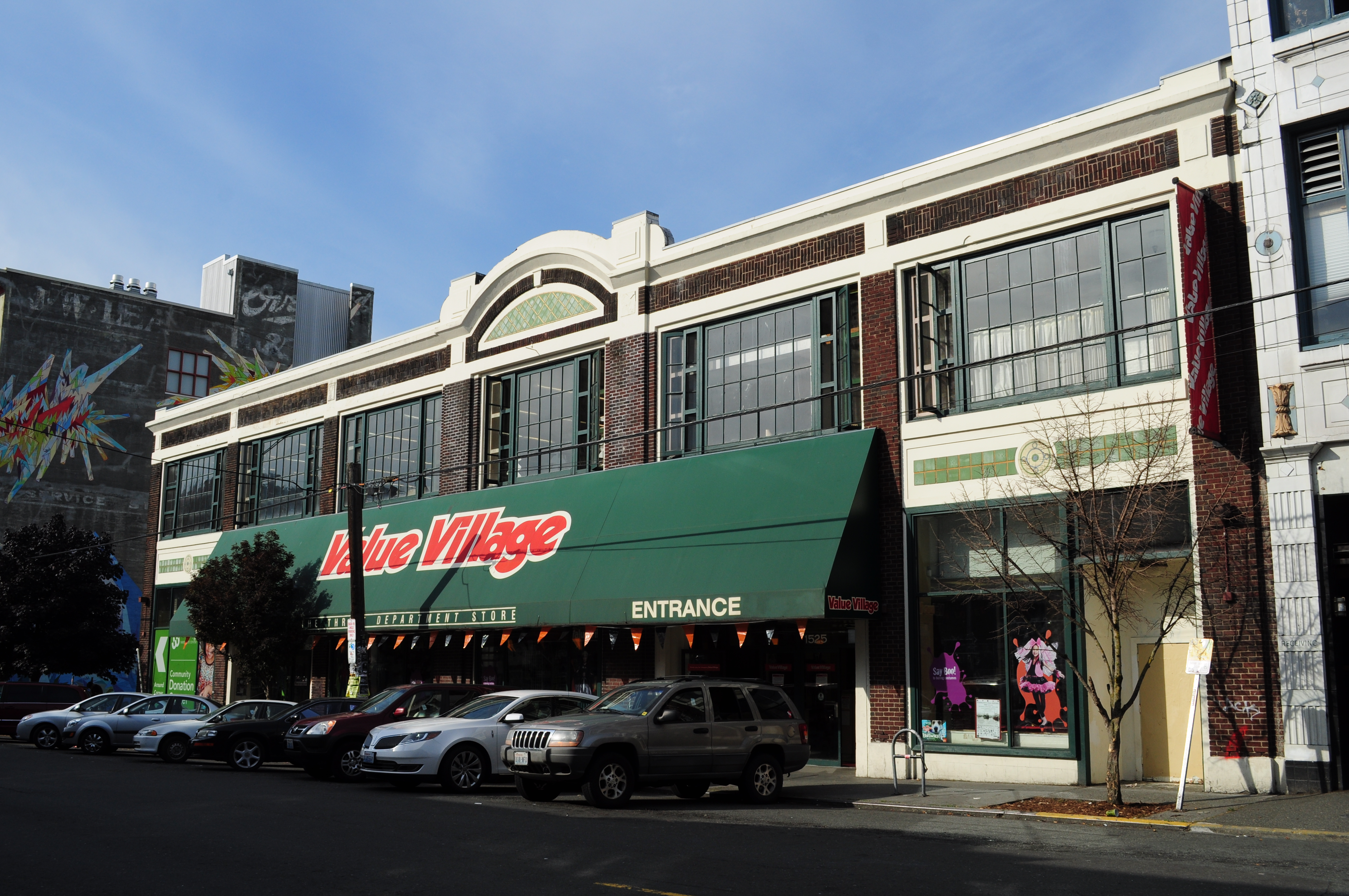
- Interactive map of the Kelly-Springfield Motor Truck Co. Building area

General information
- Location: Seattle, Washington
- Coordinates: 47°36′53″N 122°19′6″W

The Kelly-Springfield Motor Truck Co. Building is a building in Seattle, in the U.S. state of Washington. The building has been designated a city landmark, and has been expanded to include additional office space.

== Description ==
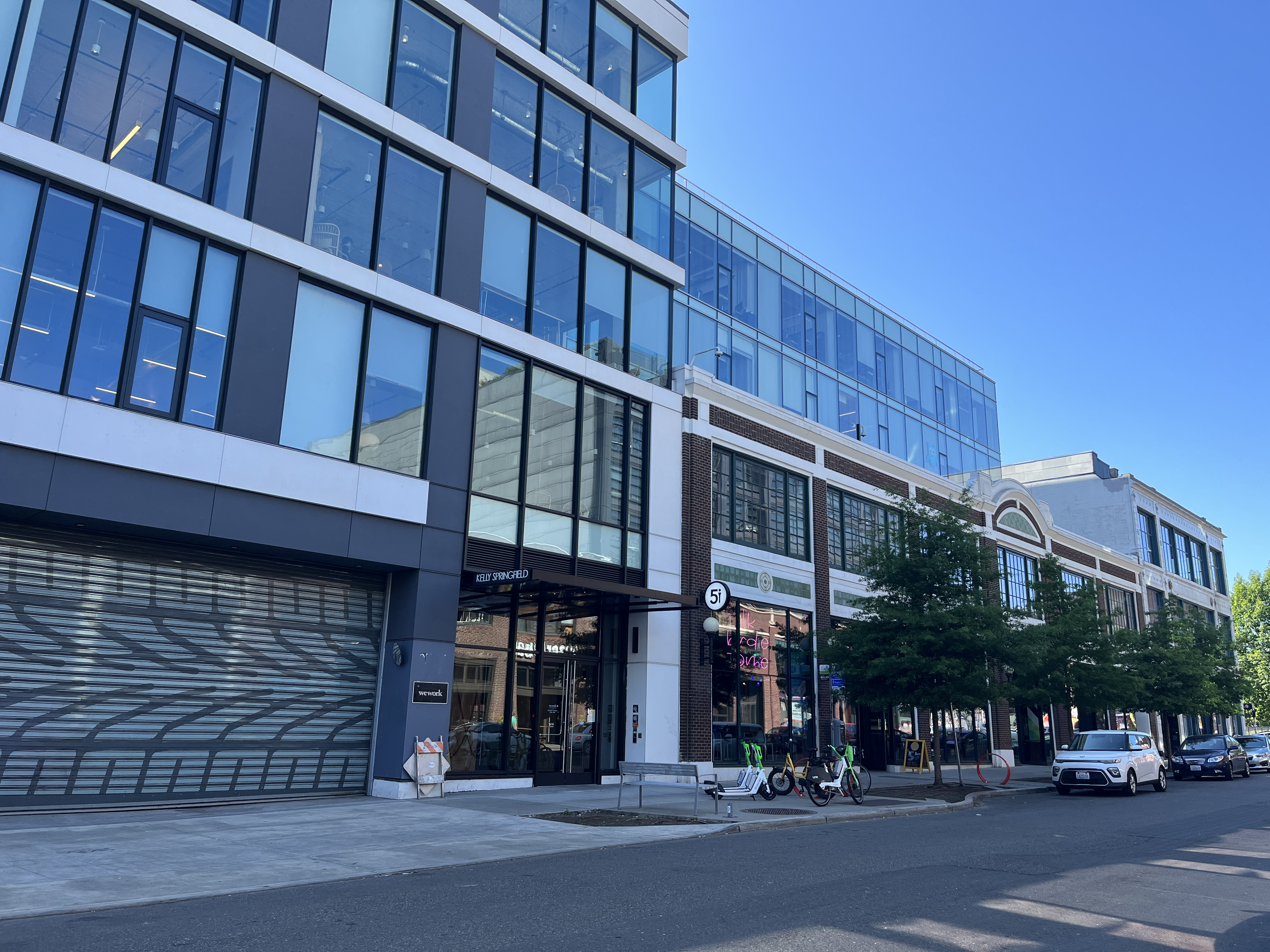
The building's exterior in 2023

The building is located on 11th Avenue between Pike and Pine streets on Seattle's Capitol Hill. The original building was completed built in 1917 and later housed stores for REI and Value Village. It was renovated in 2017 and leased by WeWork.

== See also ==
- Kelly-Springfield Motor Truck Company
- List of Seattle landmarks
