= Tenpeak Mountain =

Mountain in Washington (state), United States

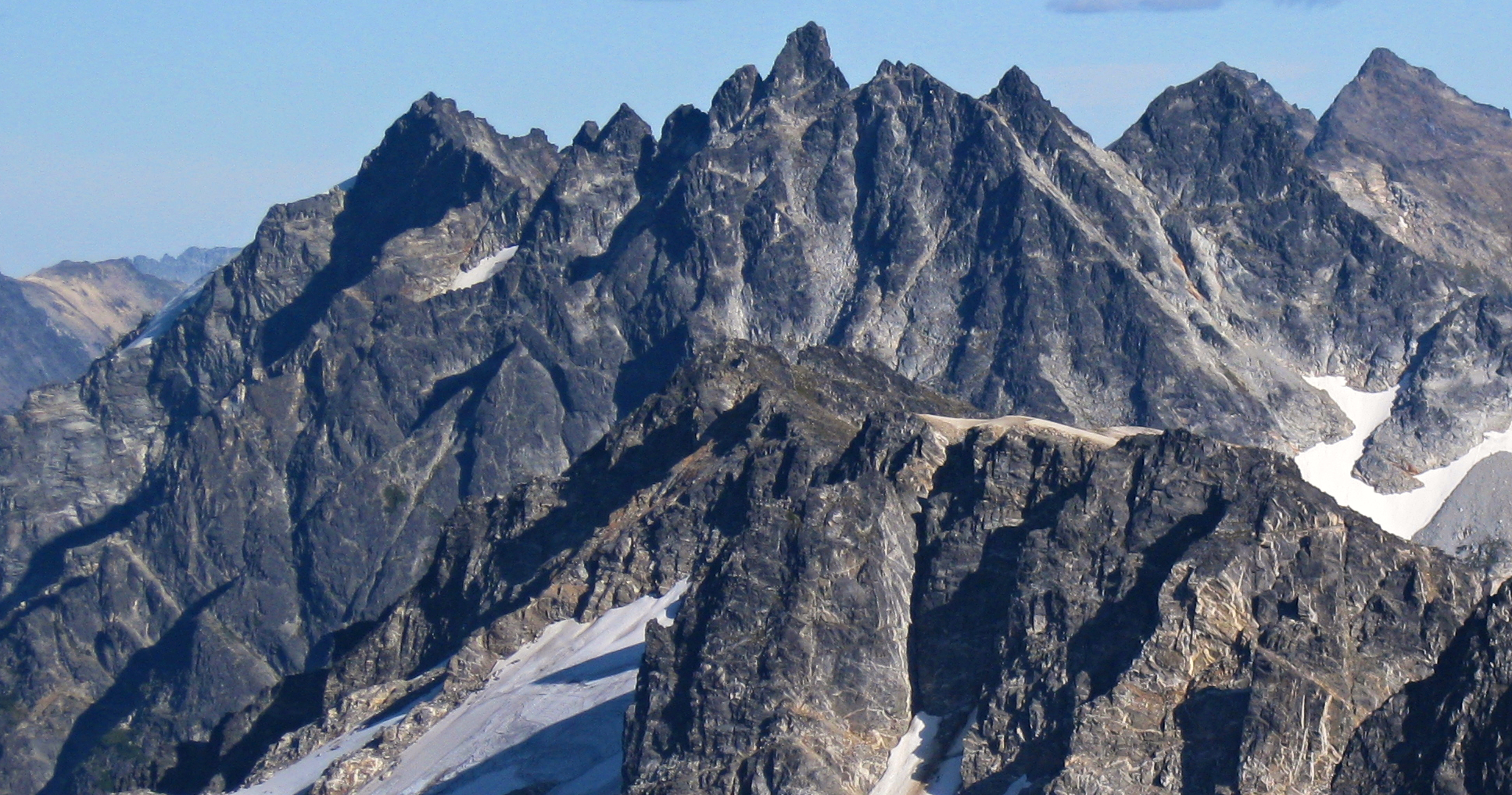
- West aspect

Highest point
- Elevation: 8,312 ft (2,533 m)
- Prominence: 536 ft (163 m)
- Parent peak: Luahna Peak
- Isolation: 2.10 mi (3.38 km)
- Coordinates: 48°04′38″N 121°02′04″W

Geography
- Location within Washington (state) Location within the United States
- Interactive map of Tenpeak Mountain
- Country: United States
- State: Washington
- County: Snohomish / Chelan
- Protected area: Glacier Peak Wilderness
- Parent range: North Cascades; Cascade Range
- Topo map: USGS Glacier Peak East

Geology
- Rock age: Cretaceous
- Rock type: granitic

Climbing
- First ascent: 1940
- Easiest route: class 4 scrambling

Tenpeak Mountain is an 8,312-foot (2,533-metre) mountain summit located in the Glacier Peak Wilderness of the North Cascades in Washington state. Tenpeak is situated on the crest of the Cascade Range, on the shared border of Snohomish County and Chelan County, also straddling the boundary between the Mount Baker-Snoqualmie National Forest and the Wenatchee National Forest. Its nearest higher neighbor is Luahna Peak, 2.5 mi (4.0 km) to the southeast. Topographic relief is significant since the northern aspect of the mountain rises 4,200 feet above the Suiattle Valley in approximately 1.5 mi (2.4 km). This mountain has small, unnamed, hanging glaciers in cirques surrounding the summit, and the terminus of the Honeycomb Glacier lies below the western base of the mountain. Precipitation runoff from the mountain and meltwater from the glaciers drains south into White River; or north into the Suiattle River. This mountain's descriptive name was suggested by The Mountaineers, and was officially adopted in 1918 by the U.S. Board on Geographic Names. The first ascent was made September 21, 1940, by Lloyd Anderson and Tom Campbell.

== Geology ==
The North Cascades features some of the most rugged topography in the Cascade Range with craggy peaks, ridges, and deep glacial valleys. Geological events occurring many years ago created the diverse topography and drastic elevation changes over the Cascade Range leading to various climate differences.

The history of the formation of the Cascade Mountains dates back millions of years ago to the late Eocene Epoch. With the North American Plate overriding the Pacific Plate, episodes of volcanic igneous activity persisted. In addition, small fragments of the oceanic and continental lithosphere called terranes created the North Cascades about 50 million years ago. During the Pleistocene period dating back over two million years ago, glaciation advancing and retreating repeatedly scoured and shaped the landscape. Glaciation was most prevalent approximately 18,000 years ago, and most valleys were ice-free by 12,000 years ago. Uplift and faulting in combination with glaciation have been the dominant processes which have created the tall peaks and deep valleys of the North Cascades area.

Subduction and tectonic activity in the area began during the late cretaceous period, about 90 million years ago. Extensive volcanic activity began to take place in the oligocene, about 35 million years ago. Glacier Peak, a stratovolcano that is 4.4 mi (7.1 km) northwest of Tenpeak Mountain, began forming in the mid-Pleistocene. Due to Glacier Peak's proximity to Tenpeak Mountain, volcanic ash is common in the area.

== Climate ==
Tenpeak Mountain is located in the marine west coast climate zone of western North America. Most weather fronts originating in the Pacific Ocean travel northeast toward the Cascade Mountains. As fronts approach the North Cascades, they are forced upward by the peaks of the Cascade Range (orographic lift), causing them to drop their moisture in the form of rain or snowfall onto the Cascades. As a result, the west side of the North Cascades experiences high precipitation, especially during the winter months in the form of snowfall. Because of maritime influence, snow tends to be wet and heavy, resulting in high avalanche danger. During winter months, weather is usually cloudy, but due to high pressure systems over the Pacific Ocean that intensify during summer months, there is often little or no cloud cover during the summer. Due to its temperate climate and proximity to the Pacific Ocean, areas west of the Cascade Crest very rarely experience temperatures below 0 °F (−18 °C) or above 80 °F (27 °C). The months July through September offer the most favorable weather for viewing or climbing this peak.

== Gallery ==
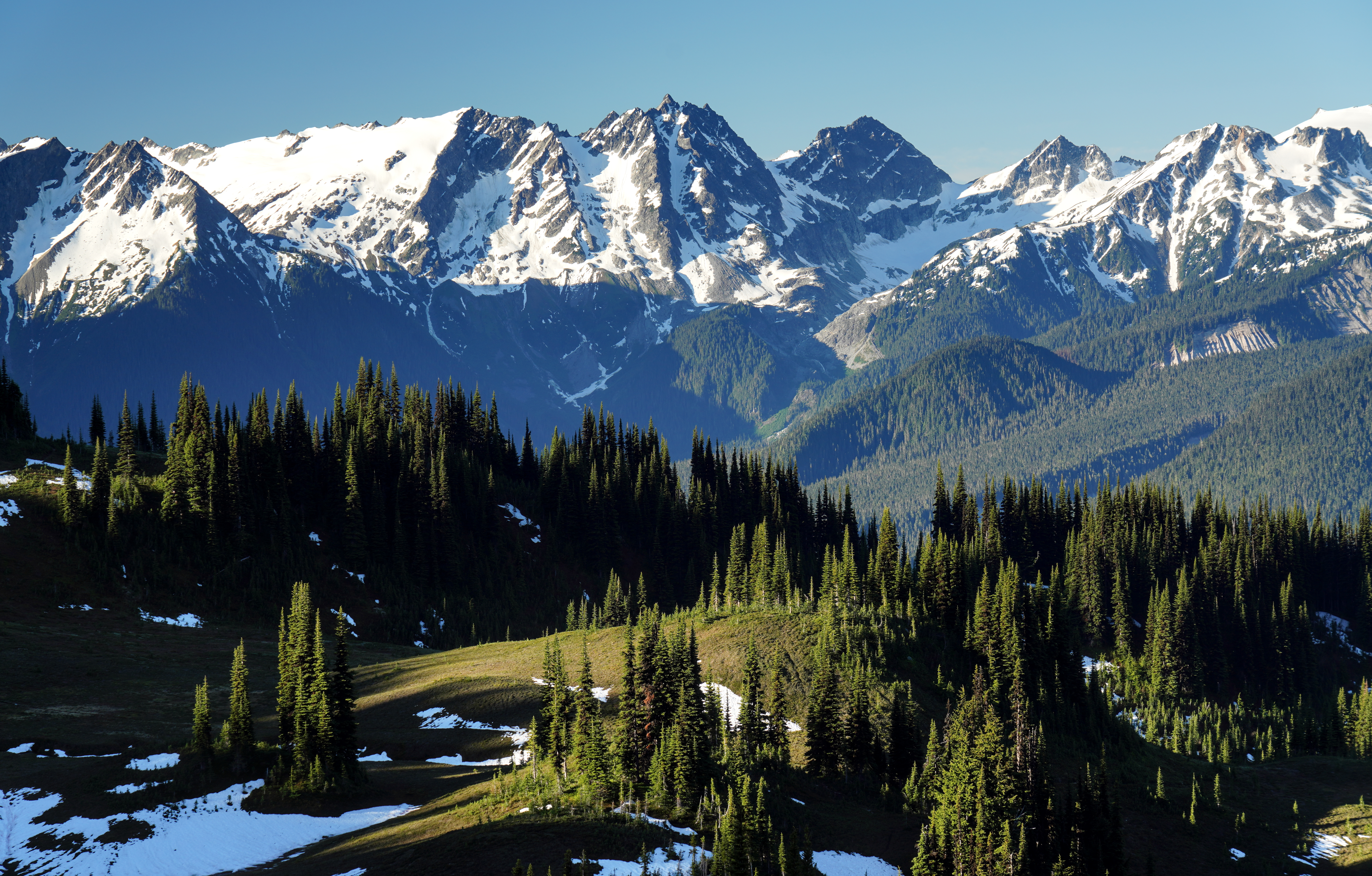
North aspect of Tenpeak viewed from Miners Ridge

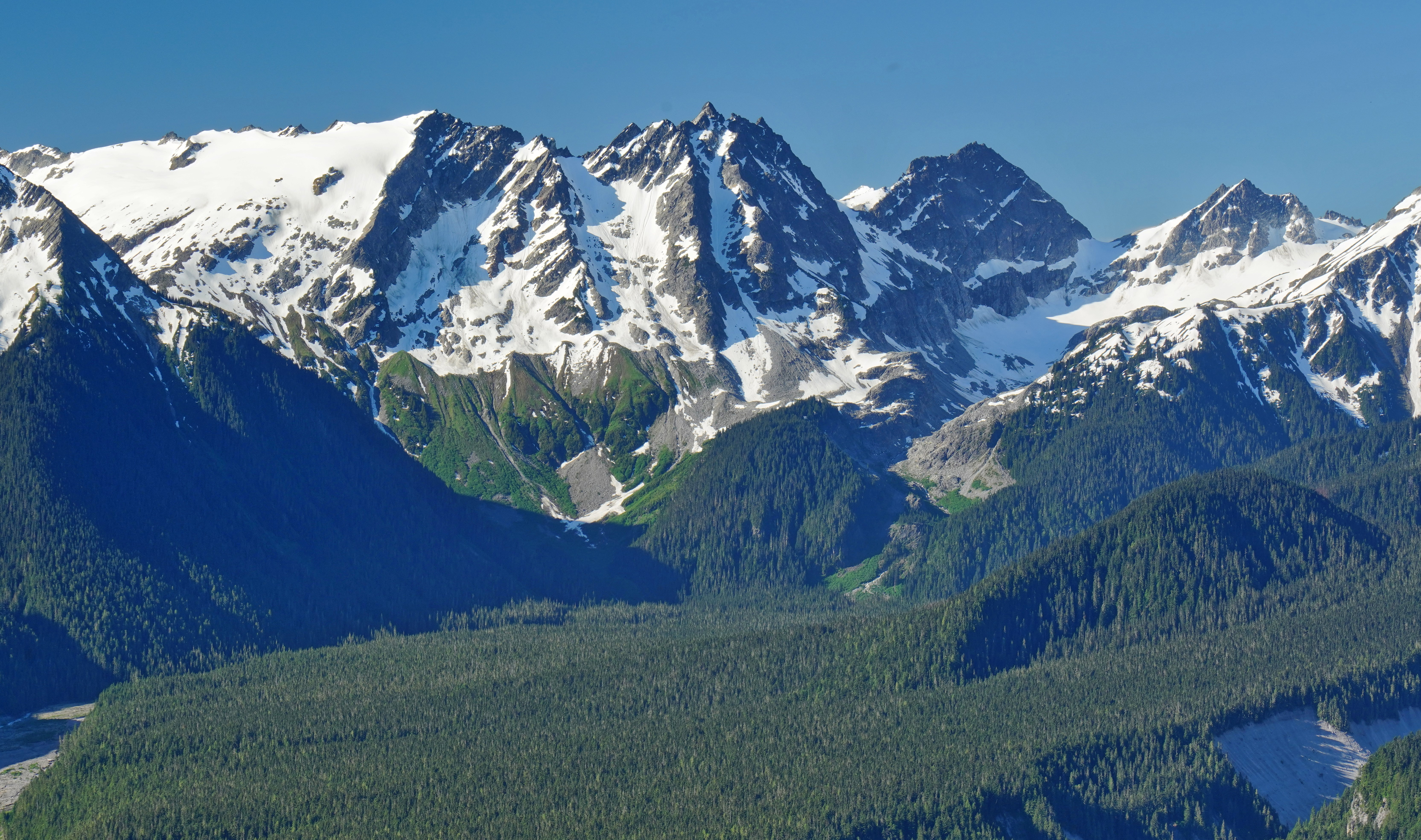
North aspect

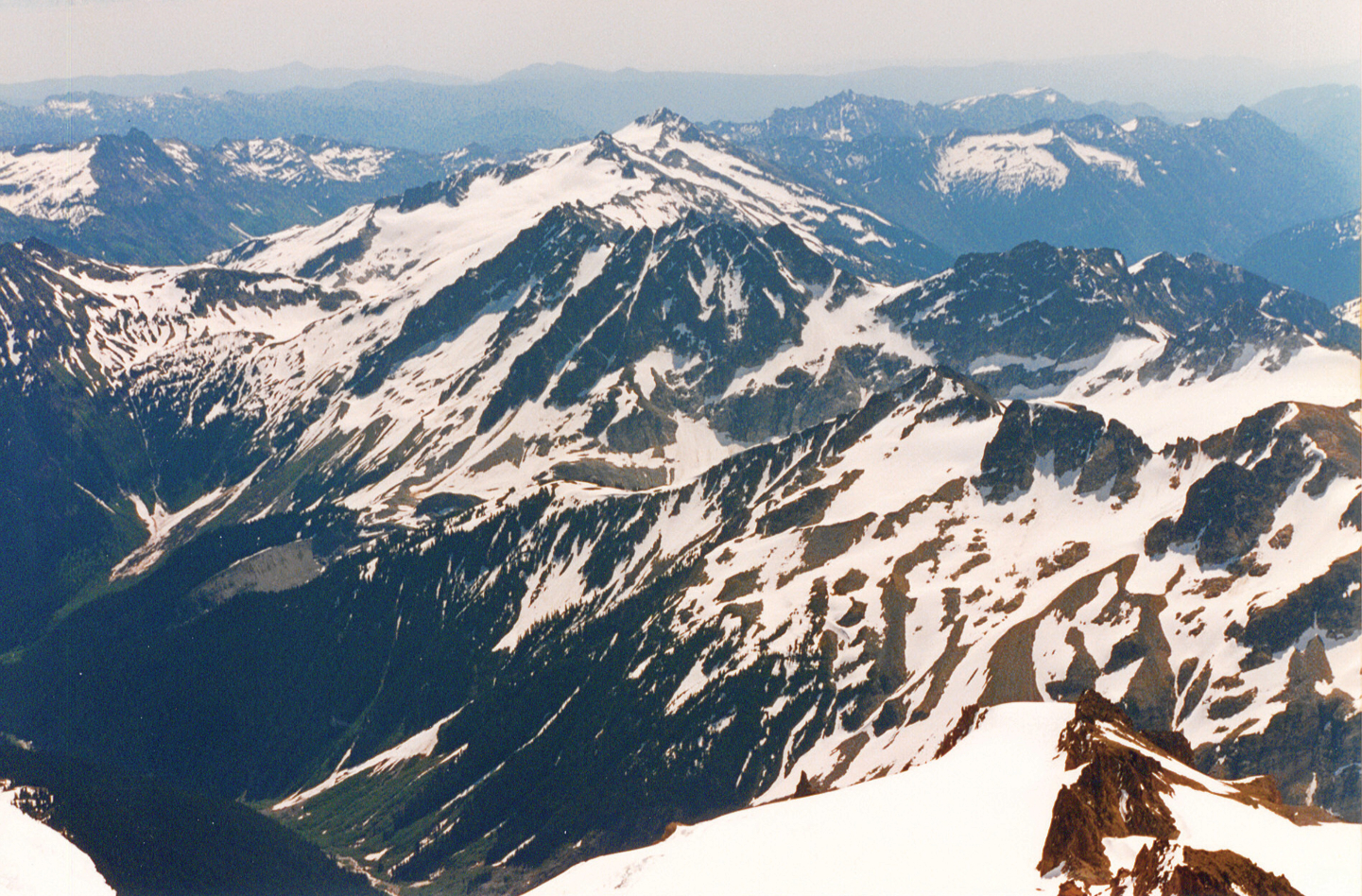
Tenpeak seen from Glacier Peak

== See also ==
- Geography of the North Cascades
- List of Highest Mountain Peaks in Washington
