= Mary Anderson (business executive) =

American business executive (1909–2017)

- Born: Mary Gertrude Gaiser; December 7, 1909; Yakima, Washington, US
- Died: March 27, 2017 (aged 107); Washington, US
- Occupations: Teacher, Executive
- Years active: 1938–1968
- Known for: Co-founder of Recreational Equipment, Inc. (REI)
- Spouse: Lloyd Anderson (m.1932–2000, his death)
- Children: 2 daughters

Mary Gertrude Anderson (née Gaiser; December 7, 1909 – March 27, 2017) was an American business executive, known for co-founding Recreational Equipment, Inc. (REI) in 1938 with her husband, Lloyd Anderson.

As avid mountaineers in Seattle, Washington, they saw a need for quality gear so created a consumer cooperative company that is one of the largest recreational equipment retailers. They were inducted into the Cooperative Business Association's Hall of Fame in 1993.

In honor of her 100th birthday in 2009, December 7 was "Mary Anderson Day" in Washington state and the city of Seattle.

== Early life and education ==
Mary Gertrude Gaiser was born on December 7, 1909, in Yakima, Washington, to John and Gertrude Gaiser. She contracted polio at age six and spent time in an iron lung; her recovery fostered a lifelong passion for the outdoors. She moved to Seattle and worked as a grade-school teacher in the 1930s, incorporating nature studies into her curriculum. In 1929, she joined The Mountaineers with her future husband Lloyd. They were among the earliest graduates of the club's basic climbing course in the mid-1930s, studying under mountaineering instructor Wolf Bauer. After graduating, they began instructing other aspiring climbers. Mary later served two terms as secretary and two as treasurer of the club.

== Family life ==
In 1932, she married Lloyd Alva Anderson. Early REI catalogs were produced with artistic contributions from her daughters, Ruth and Sue. She died at age 107 in 2017.

== Legacy ==
In 2009, the REI Foundation established the Mary Anderson Legacy Grant, a $50,000 annual award to support programs that engage youth in hands-on outdoor education and exploration. The Mountaineers received the grant in 2011 and 2012 to expand youth outreach programs.

== Mountaineering achievements ==
Anderson scaled more than 60 peaks in the 1950s and 1960s, and established several first ascents in the North Cascades. She also assisted Lloyd with the "Climber's Notebook," a project that evolved into the first edition of Mountaineering: The Freedom of the Hills (1960), which became the standard reference for climbers worldwide.

== See also ==
- Recreational Equipment, Inc.
- Lloyd Anderson
