= Clark Mountain (Washington) =

Mountain in Washington (state), United States

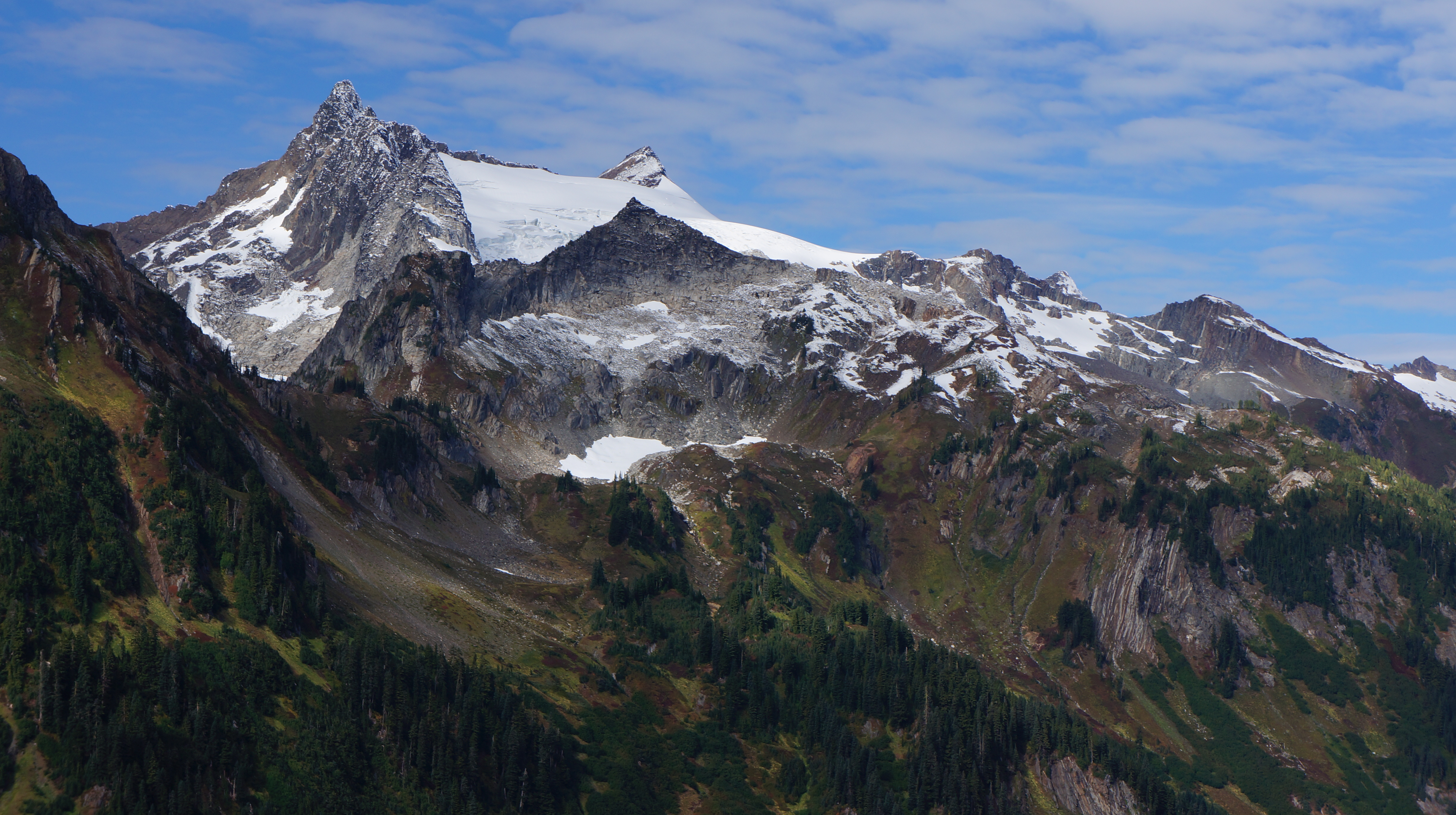
- Clark Mountain

Highest point
- Elevation: 8,602 ft (2,622 m)
- Prominence: 1,522 ft (464 m)
- Coordinates: 48°03′00″N 120°58′08″W

Geography
- Location within Washington (state) Location within the United States
- Location: Chelan County, Washington, U.S.
- Parent range: Cascade Range
- Topo map: USGS Clark Mountain

Climbing
- Easiest route: class 3

Clark Mountain (8,602 feet (2,622 m)) is in Wenatchee National Forests in the U.S. state of Washington. Clark Mountain is the tallest peak in the Dakobed Range and lies 8 mi (13 km) southeast of Glacier Peak. Richardson Glacier descends to the northeast of the summit, while Clark Glacier lies on the east slopes. Luahna Peak lies 1.04 mi (1.67 km) to the northwest.

== Geology ==
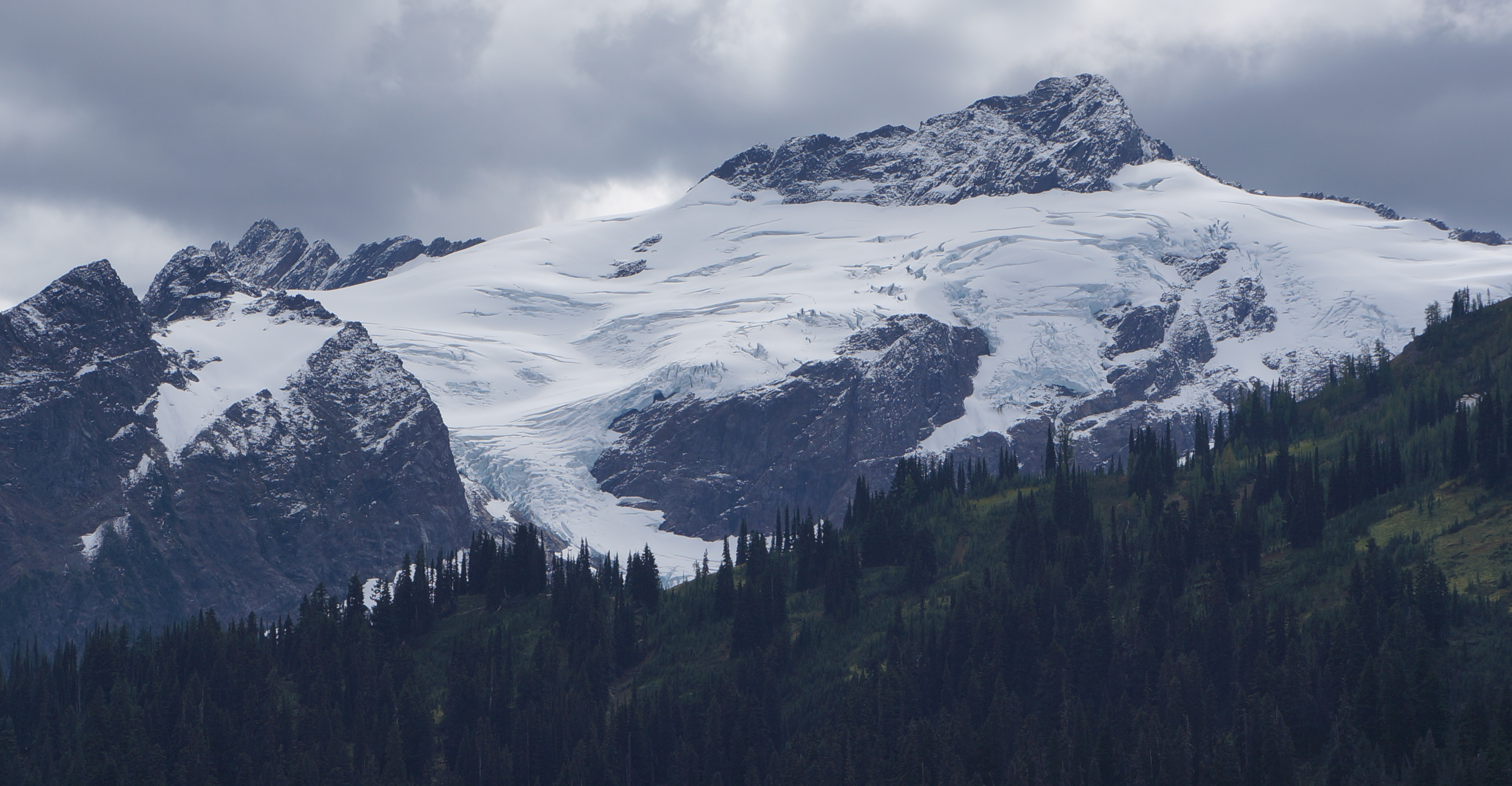
The north glaciers on Clark Mountain

The North Cascades features some of the most rugged topography in the Cascade Range with craggy peaks, spires, ridges, and deep glacial valleys. Geological events occurring many years ago created the diverse topography and drastic elevation changes over the Cascade Range leading to the various climate differences.

The history of the formation of the Cascade Mountains dates back millions of years ago to the late Eocene Epoch. With the North American Plate overriding the Pacific Plate, episodes of volcanic igneous activity persisted. In addition, small fragments of the oceanic and continental lithosphere called terranes created the North Cascades about 50 million years ago.

During the Pleistocene period dating back over two million years ago, glaciation advancing and retreating repeatedly scoured the landscape leaving deposits of rock debris. The U-shaped cross section of the river valleys is a result of recent glaciation. Uplift and faulting in combination with glaciation have been the dominant processes which have created the tall peaks and deep valleys of the North Cascades area.
