= Clark Glacier (Washington) =

Glacier in Washington, United States

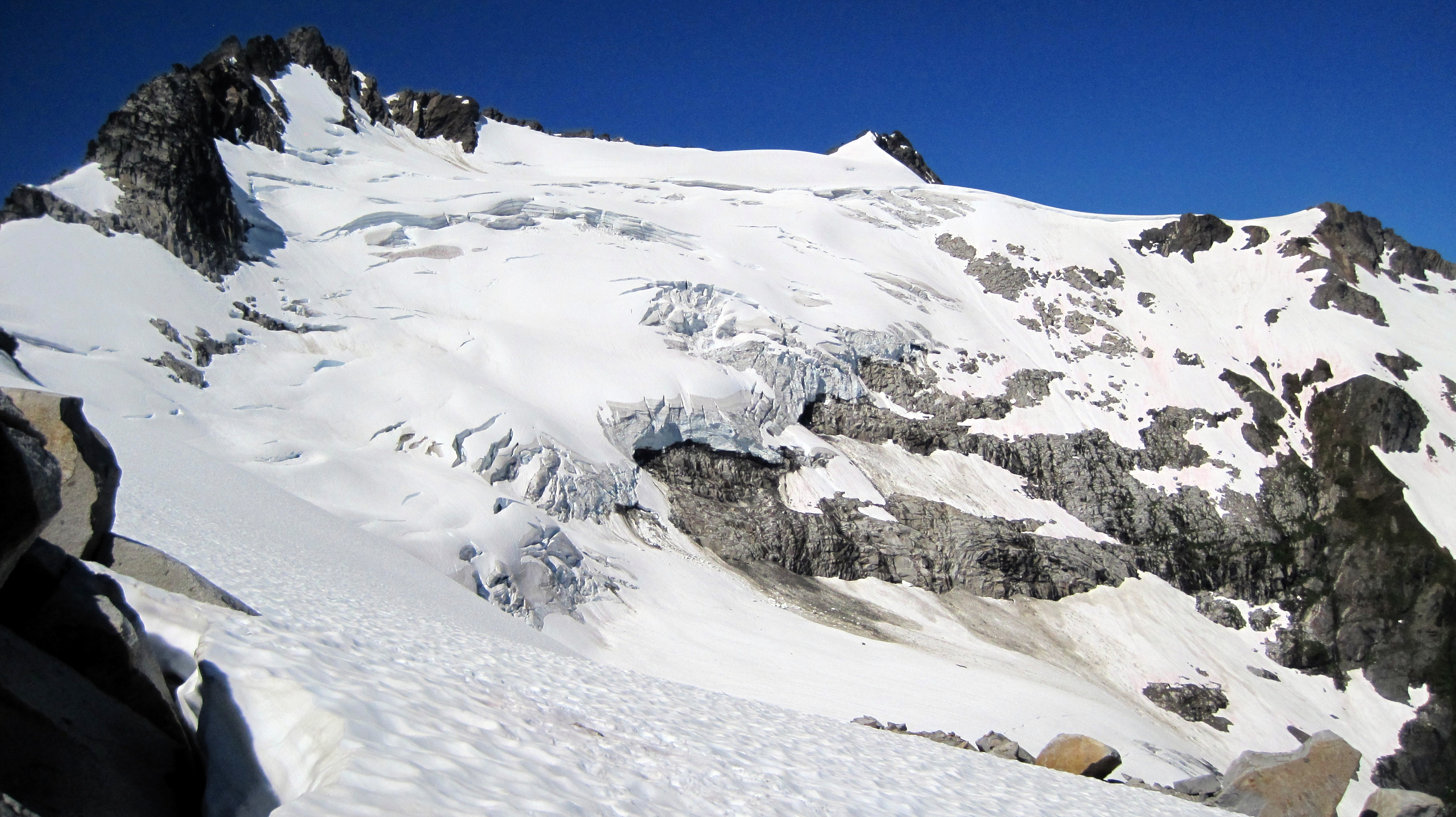
- Clark Glacier on Clark Mountain

- Location within Washington (state)
- Type: Alpine glacier
- Location: Chelan County, Washington, U.S.
- Coordinates: 48°02′56″N 120°57′32″W
- Length: .80 mi (1.29 km)
- Terminus: Barren rock/icefall
- Status: Retreating

Clark Glacier is in Wenatchee National Forest in the U.S. state of Washington and is on the east slopes of Clark Mountain. Clark Glacier descends from 8,000 to 6,600 ft (2,400 to 2,000 m). Clark Glacier is connected to Richardson Glacier to the west at its upper margins. Clark Glacier has also been known as Walrus Glacier.

== See also ==
- List of glaciers in the United States
