= Kelly-Springfield Motor Truck Company =

- Industry: Automotive
- Founded: 1910; 116 years ago
- Founder: Edwin S. Kelly
- Defunct: 1929; 97 years ago
- Headquarters: Springfield, Ohio
- Products: buses, trucks

The Kelly-Springfield Motor Truck Company was an American manufacturer of trucks and later buses based in Springfield, Ohio. It was established in 1910 by Edwin S. Kelly, who had previously co-founded the Kelly-Springfield Tire Company.

== History ==
Edwin Kelly purchased the Frayer Miller Auto Company in 1909 (the tire company having been sold in 1895) and renamed it the Kelly Motor Truck Company; in 1912 it became the Kelly-Springfield Motor Truck Company. The company initially produced trucks with air-cooled Frayer engines, but in 1912 it introduced three new models using water-cooled engines of its own design: the one-and-a-half-ton K-31, the two-and-a-half ton K-35 and the three-and-a-half ton K-40. Later, it brought out the five-ton K-50. (See the external links section for specifications of all four models.)

The business expanded across the United States, including a headquarters in San Francisco, branches in Seattle (1917–1926) and Indianapolis and a distributorship in Los Angeles. In April 1914, the Pacific Motor Coach Co. of Los Angeles placed an order for 105 of its trucks, possibly "the largest single order ever placed for motor trucks" to that time.

According to The Illustrated Encyclopedia of American Trucks and Commercial Vehicles by Albert Mroz, the company produced 301 of the 9,364 Liberty trucks supplied to the United States Army for World War I. Another source states that the company only managed to produce 16 before the war ended and the contract was canceled. It also supplied K-40s to the Canadian Army and K-35s to the French Army. However, it seems they were unable to stand up to the rigors of military use. (Part of a K-35 probably used by the French Army survives.)

A distributor stated that the company had fulfilled an order for 5900 trucks for the United States Post Office in September 1918 and had expanded its capacity 600% (from August 1914 to February 1919). By 1920, when it was taken over by Hare's Motors, it had a large plant in Springfield, Ohio, and produced trucks ranging in size from one and a half to six and a half tons.

On February 14, 1927, Congress approved bill H.R. 1105 "for relief of Kelly Springfield Motor Truck Company of California", but the company eventually ended operations later the same year. That year, the Kelly-Springfield Truck & Bus Corporation advertised that it wished to sell its Springfield manufacturing plant.

The Kelly-Springfield Motor Truck Co. Building in Seattle is considered a city landmark.

The Smithsonian Institution's National Museum of American History possesses some material about the company.

== Gallery ==
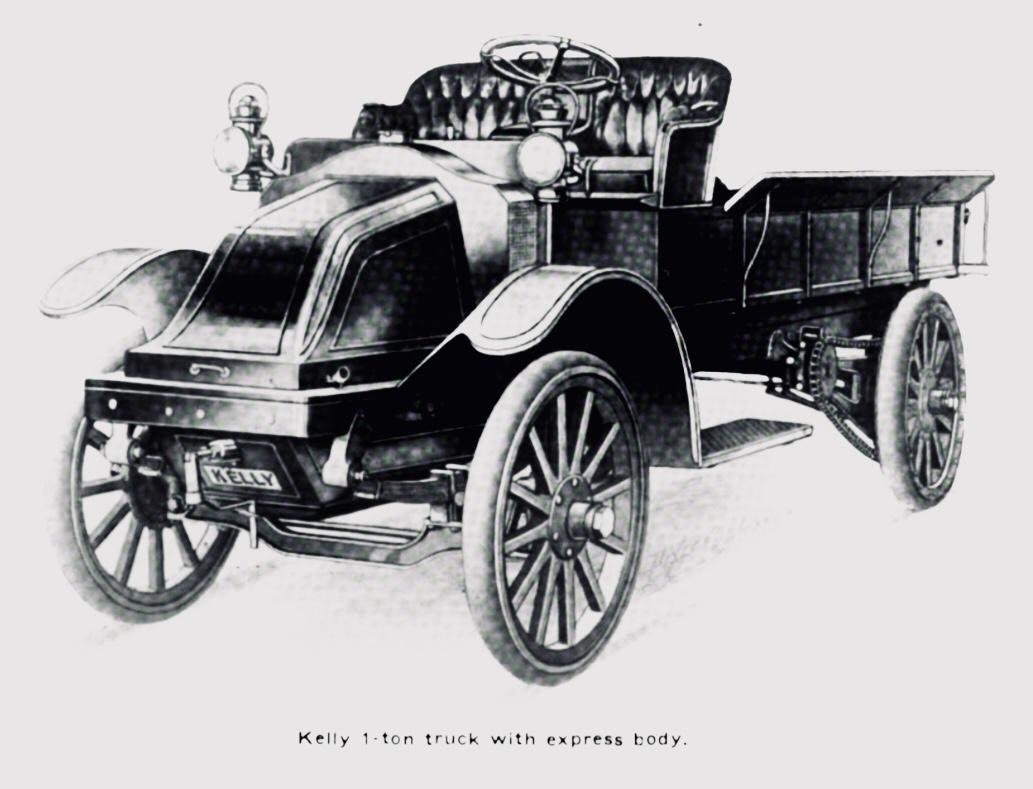
Kelly 1t (1912–1917)

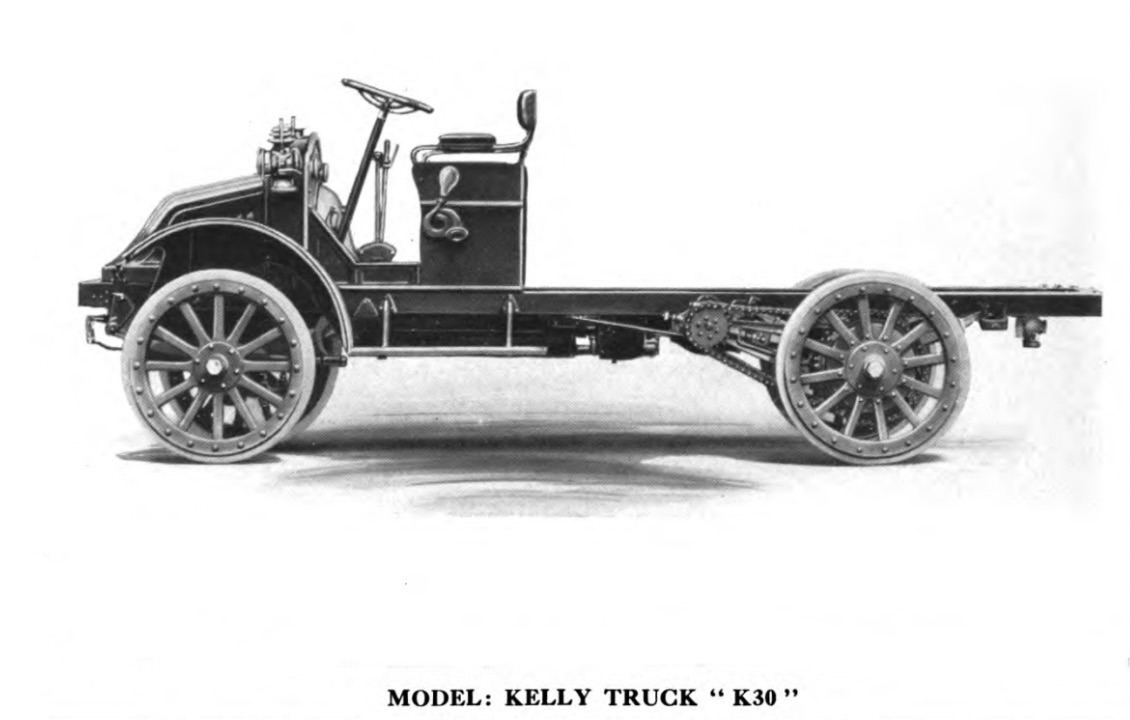
K-30

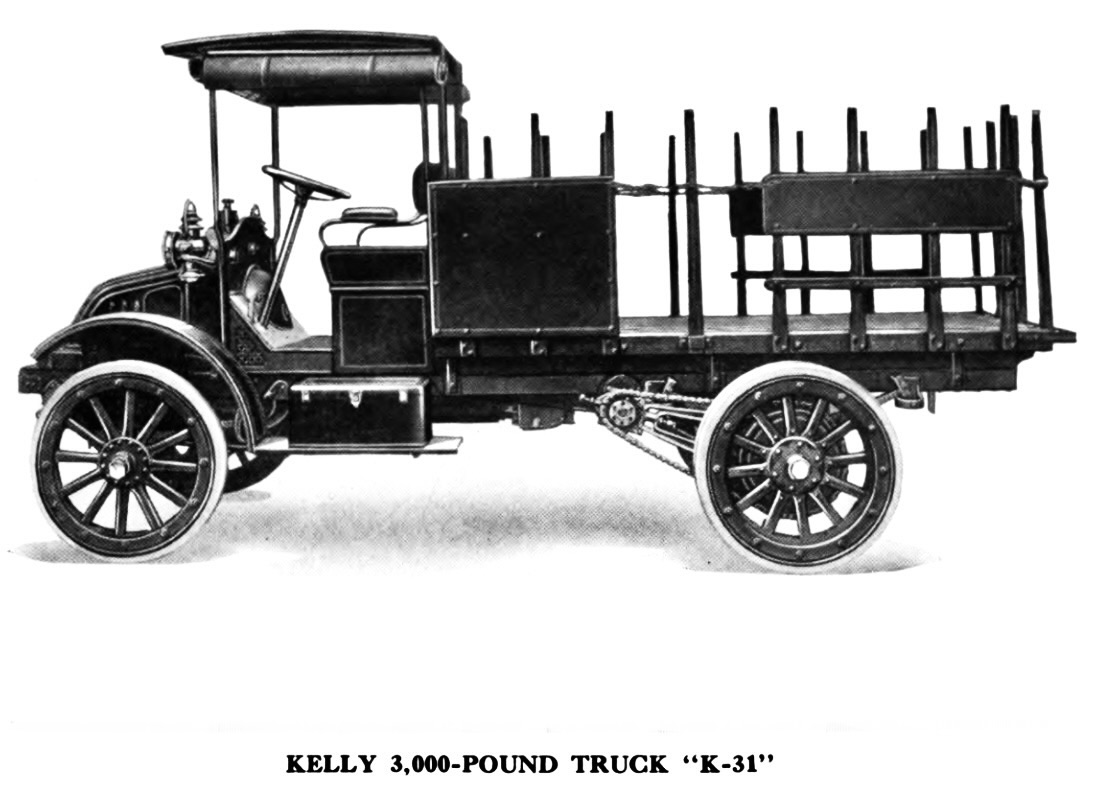
K-31

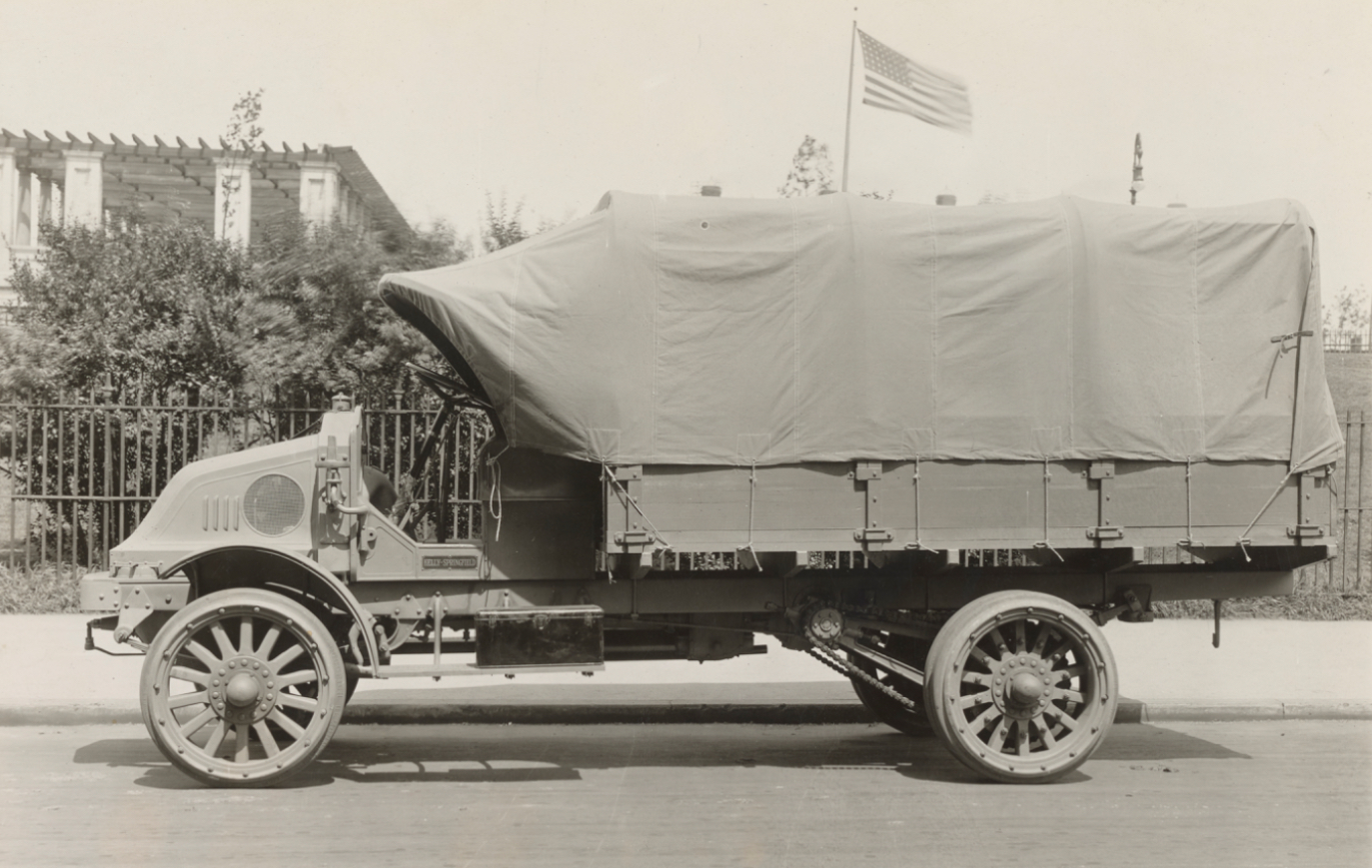
K-40 army truck

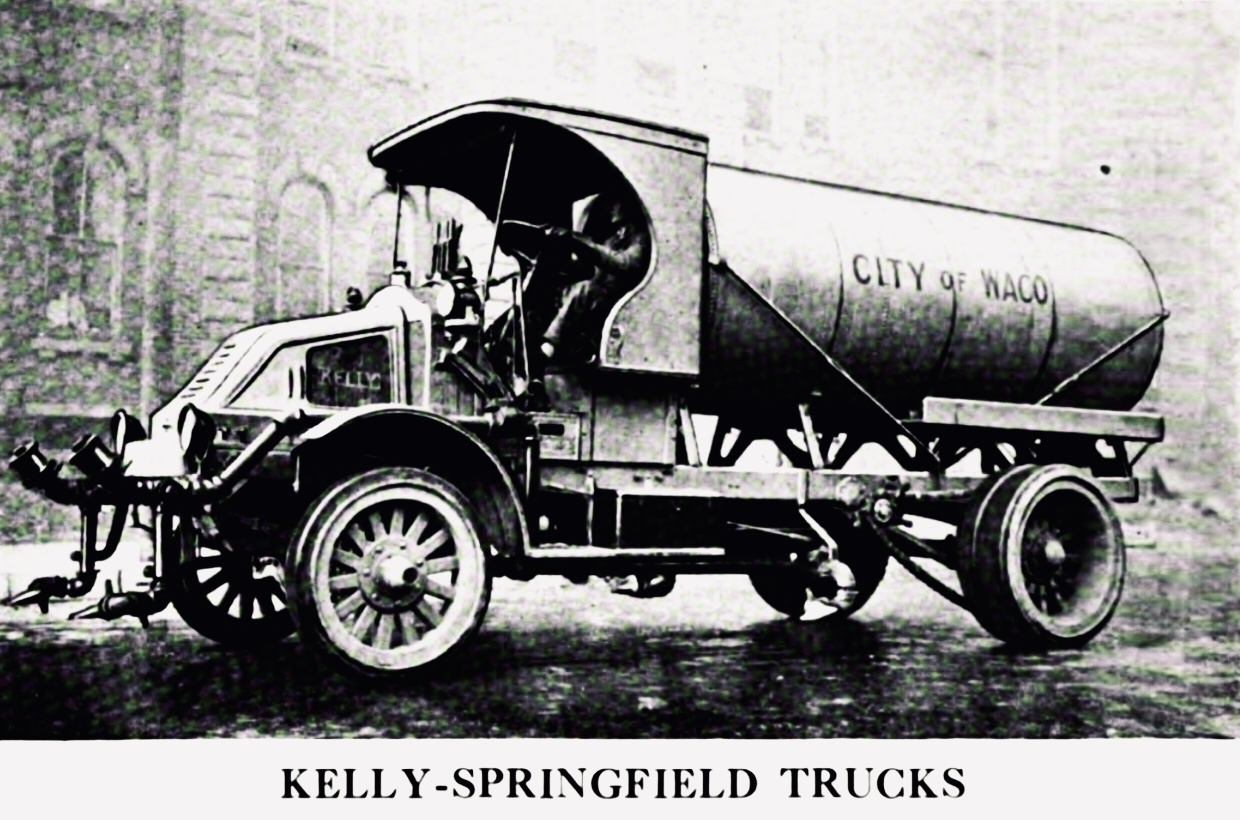
K-40 street cleaner

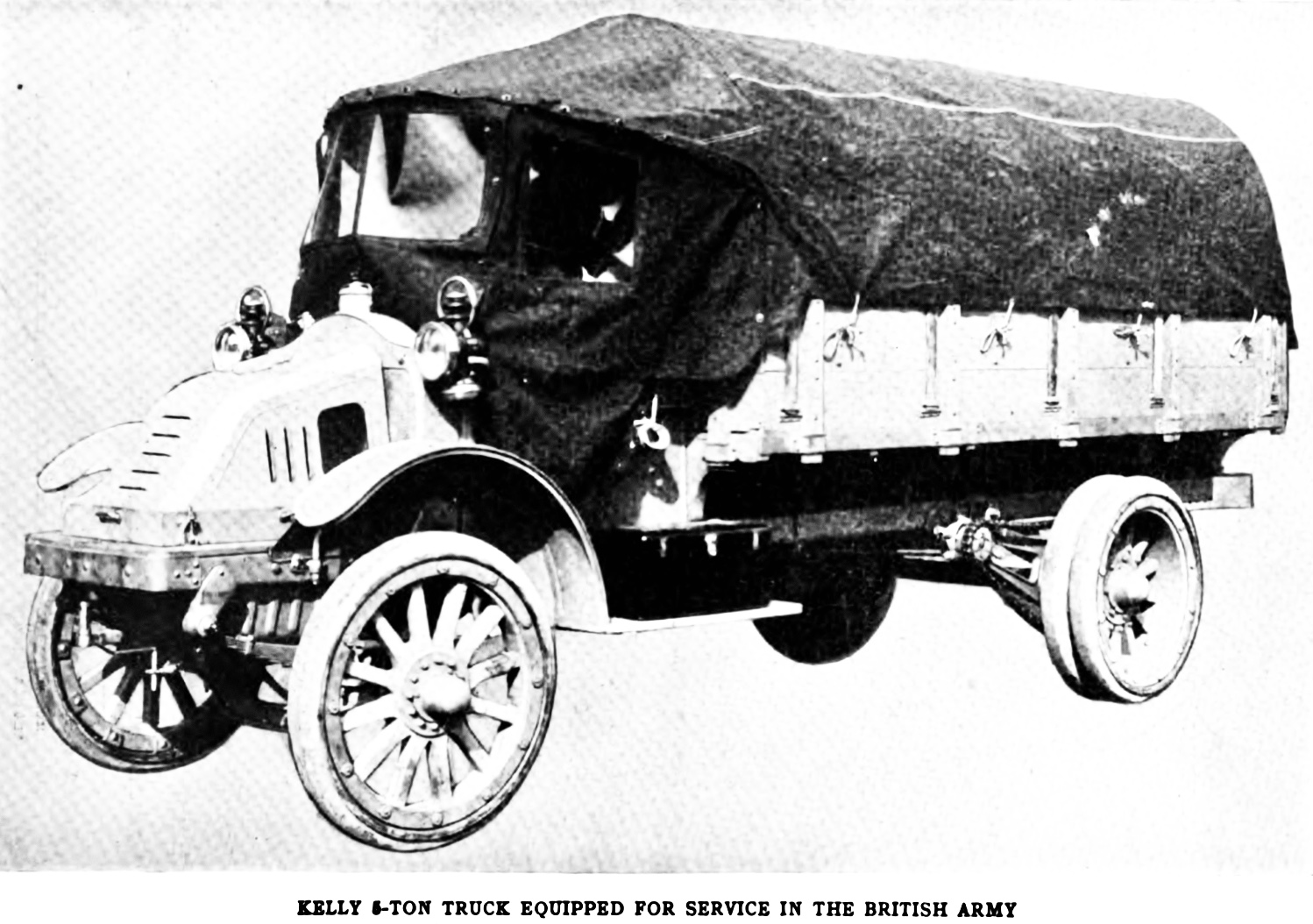
K-50

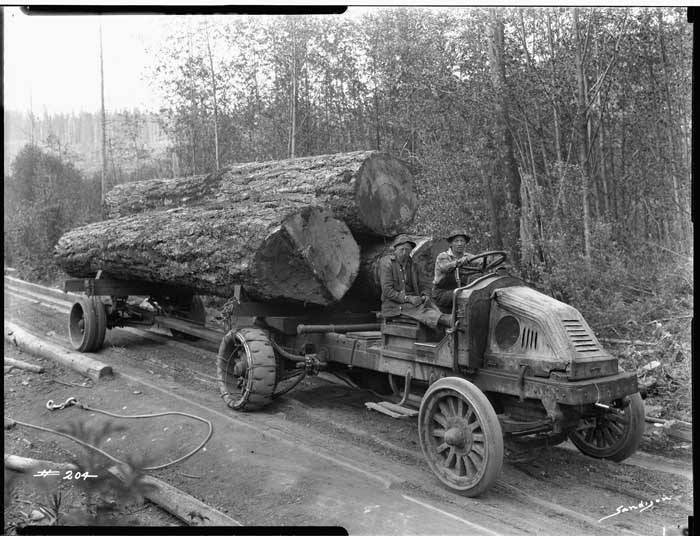
Truck hauling logs c. 1925

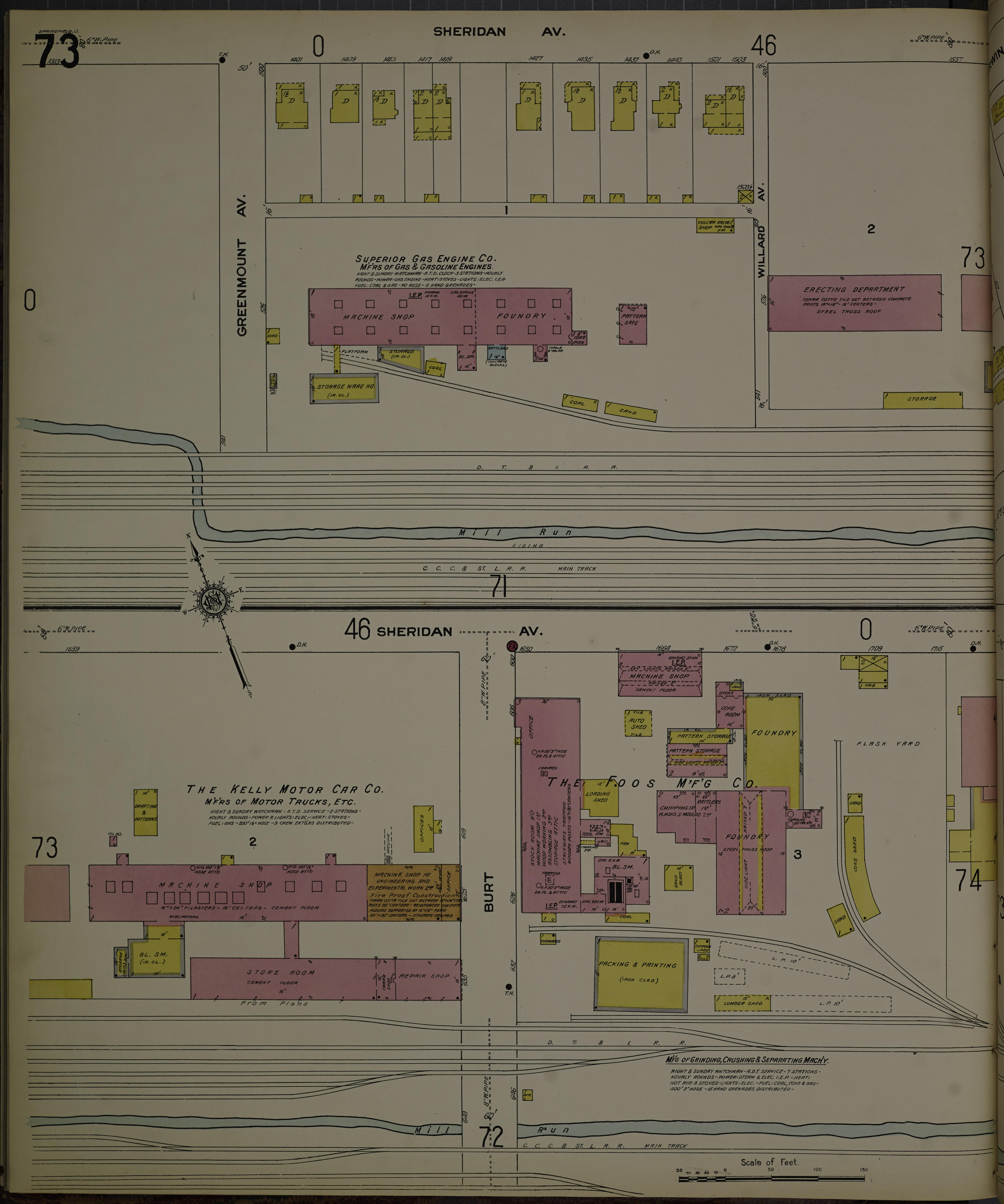
1910 plant diagrams

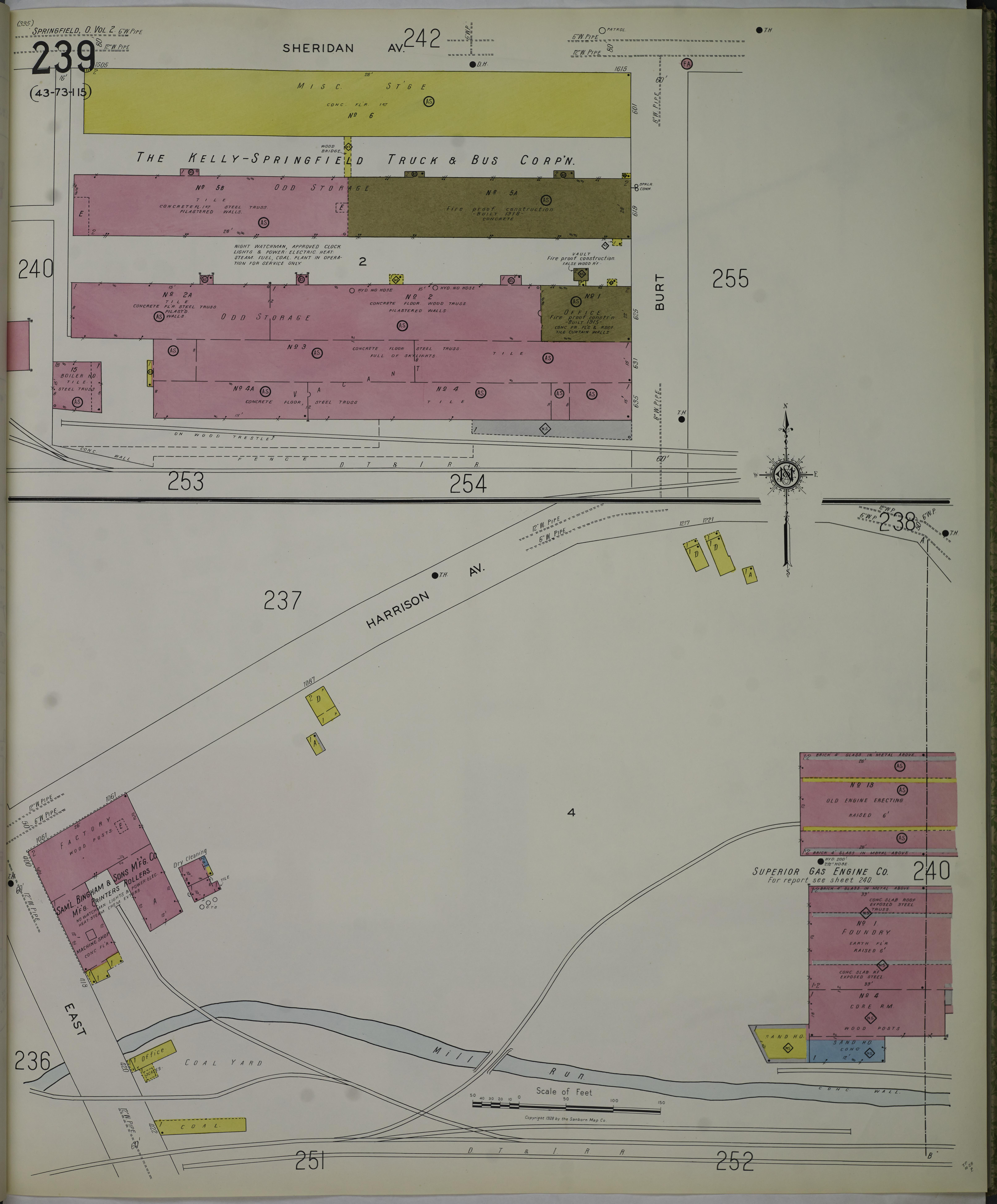
1928 plant diagrams

== Production models ==
- 1914
  - K30
- 1917
  - K-31 (1,5t)
  - K-32 (1,5t)
  - K-35 (2,5t)
  - K-36 (2,5t)
  - K-40 (3,5t)
  - K-45 (4t)
  - K-50 (5t)
  - K-60 (6t)
- 1918
  - K-31 (1,5t)
  - K-32 (1,5t)
  - K-35 (2,5t)
  - K-36 (2,5t)
  - K-40 (3,5t)
  - K-45 (4t)
  - K-50 (5t)
  - K-60 (6t)
- 1919
  - K-31 (1,5t)
  - K-32 (1,5t)
  - K-35 (2,5t)
  - K-36 (2,5t)
  - K-40 (3,5t)
  - K-45 (4t)
  - K-50 (5t)
  - K-60 (6t)
- 1920
  - K-31 (1,5t)
  - K-32 (1,5t)
  - K-35 (2,5t)
  - K-36 (2,5t)
  - K-40 (3,5t)
  - K-45 (4t)
  - K-50 (5t)
  - K-60 (6t)
- 1921
  - K-31 (1,5t)
  - K-32 (1,5t)
  - K-34 (1,5t)
  - K-35 (2,5t)
  - K-36 (2,5t)
  - K-38 (2,5t)
  - K-40 (3,5t)
  - K-41 (3,5t)
  - K-42 (3,5t)
  - K-45 (4t)
  - K-50 (5t)
  - K-60 (6t)
- 1922
  - K-31 (1,5t)
  - K-34 (1,5t)
  - K-35 (2,5t)
  - K-38 (2,5t)
  - K-40 (3,5t)
  - K-41 (3,5t)
  - K-42 (3,5t)
  - K-50 (5t)
  - K-60 (6t)
  - K-61 (7t)
- 1923
  - K-33 (1,5t)
  - K-35 (2,5t)
  - K-380 (2,5t)
  - K-39 (2,5t)
  - K-41 (5t)
  - K-42 (3,5t)
  - K-50 (5t)
  - K-60 (6t)
  - K-61 (7t)
