= Richardson Glacier (Washington) =

Glacier in Washington State, USA

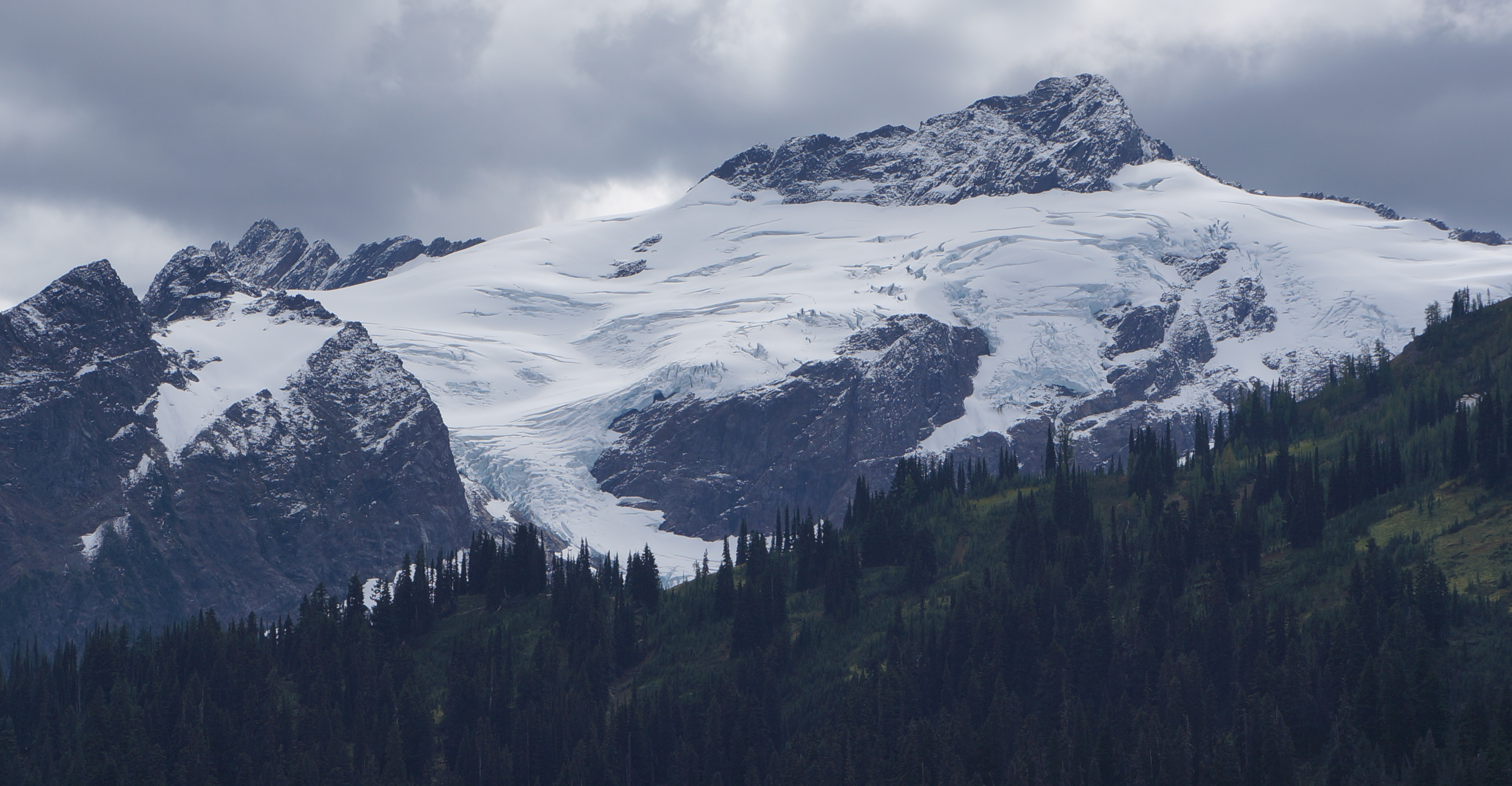
- Richardson Glacier on the north slope of Clark Mountain

- Location within Washington (state)
- Type: Alpine glacier
- Location: Chelan County, Washington, U.S.
- Coordinates: 48°03′23″N 120°58′11″W
- Length: .90 mi (1.45 km)
- Terminus: Barren rock/icefall
- Status: Retreating

Richardson Glacier is in Wenatchee National Forest in the U.S. state of Washington and is on the south slopes Luahna Peak and north slopes of Clark Mountain. Richardson Glacier descends from 7,800 to 6,600 ft (2,400 to 2,000 m). Richardson Glacier is connected to Clark Glacier to the east at its upper margins. Richardson Glacier is named after J.B. Richardson, an early settler to the region.

== See also ==
- List of glaciers in the United States
