= Lloyd Anderson =

American business executive (1902–2000)

- Born: August 4, 1902
- Died: September 13, 2000 (aged 98)
- Education: University of Washington
- Known for: REI co-founder

Lloyd Alva Anderson (August 4, 1902 – September 13, 2000) was an American business executive who co-founded the retail and outdoor recreation services corporation Recreational Equipment, Inc (REI) in 1938 with his wife Mary Anderson. As avid mountaineers they saw a need for quality gear so created a consumer cooperative company that is one of the largest recreational equipment retailers. They were inducted into the Cooperative Business Association's Hall of Fame in 1993.

== First ascents ==
Anderson's first ascents include Mount Triumph (1938), Sinister Peak (1939), Forbidden Peak (1940), Tenpeak Mountain (1940), Klawatti Peak (1940), and Dorado Needle (1940).

== Family life ==
Anderson was born to John Anderson and Adda Wilson Bush Anderson in Roy, Washington. He studied at the University of Washington, earning a bachelor of science in electrical engineering and worked for Seattle's transit utility. He died in 2000.

== Publications ==
- Lloyd Anderson's Climbing Notebook (1980) Copyright Registration Number/Date: TXu000053476 / October 3, 1980
- The History of Recreational Equipment, Inc.--a Cooperative (1980) Copyright Registration Number/Date: TXu000043397 / May 5, 1980
