= Pilz Glacier =

Glacier in Washington, United States

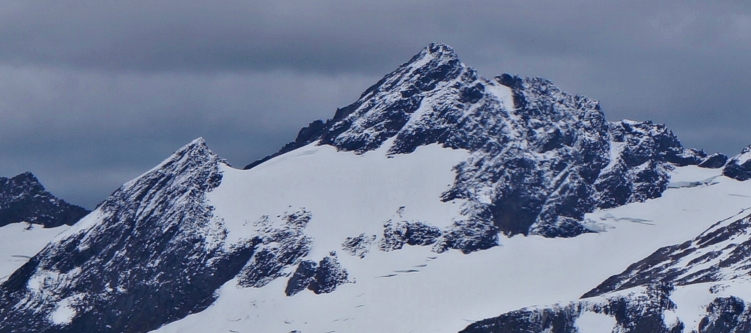
- Pilz Glacier (center) below the summit of Luahna Peak

- Location within Washington (state)
- Type: Alpine glacier
- Location: Chelan County, Washington, U.S.
- Coordinates: 48°04′11″N 120°58′19″W
- Length: .75 mi (1.21 km)
- Terminus: Barren rock/icefall
- Status: Retreating

Pilz Glacier (also known as Pit Glacier) is in Wenatchee National Forest in the U.S. state of Washington and is on the north slopes Luahna Peak. Pilz Glacier descends from 8,000 to 6,900 ft (2,400 to 2,100 m). An arête separates Pilz Glacier from Butterfly Glacier to the west. Pilz Glacier is within the Glacier Peak Wilderness and is just over 6.5 mi (10.5 km) southeast of Glacier Peak.

== See also ==
- List of glaciers in the United States
