= Butterfly Glacier =

Glacier in Washington, United States

- Location within Washington (state)
- Type: Alpine glacier
- Location: Chelan and Snohomish County, Washington, U.S.
- Coordinates: 48°04′04″N 120°59′41″W
- Length: .70 mi (1.13 km)
- Terminus: Barren rock/icefall
- Status: Retreating

Butterfly Glacier is in Wenatchee National Forest in the U.S. state of Washington and is on the northwest slopes of the northwest summit of Luahna Peak and the ridge which extends west from the peak. Butterfly Glacier is separated into two glaciers, the larger one in the east descends from 8,000 to 6,600 ft (2,400 to 2,000 m). An arête separates Butterfly Glacier from Pilz Glacier to the east. Butterfly Glacier is within the Glacier Peak Wilderness and is just over 6 mi (9.7 km) southeast of Glacier Peak.

== See also ==
- List of glaciers in the United States
