= Luahna Peak =

Mountain in Washington (state), United States

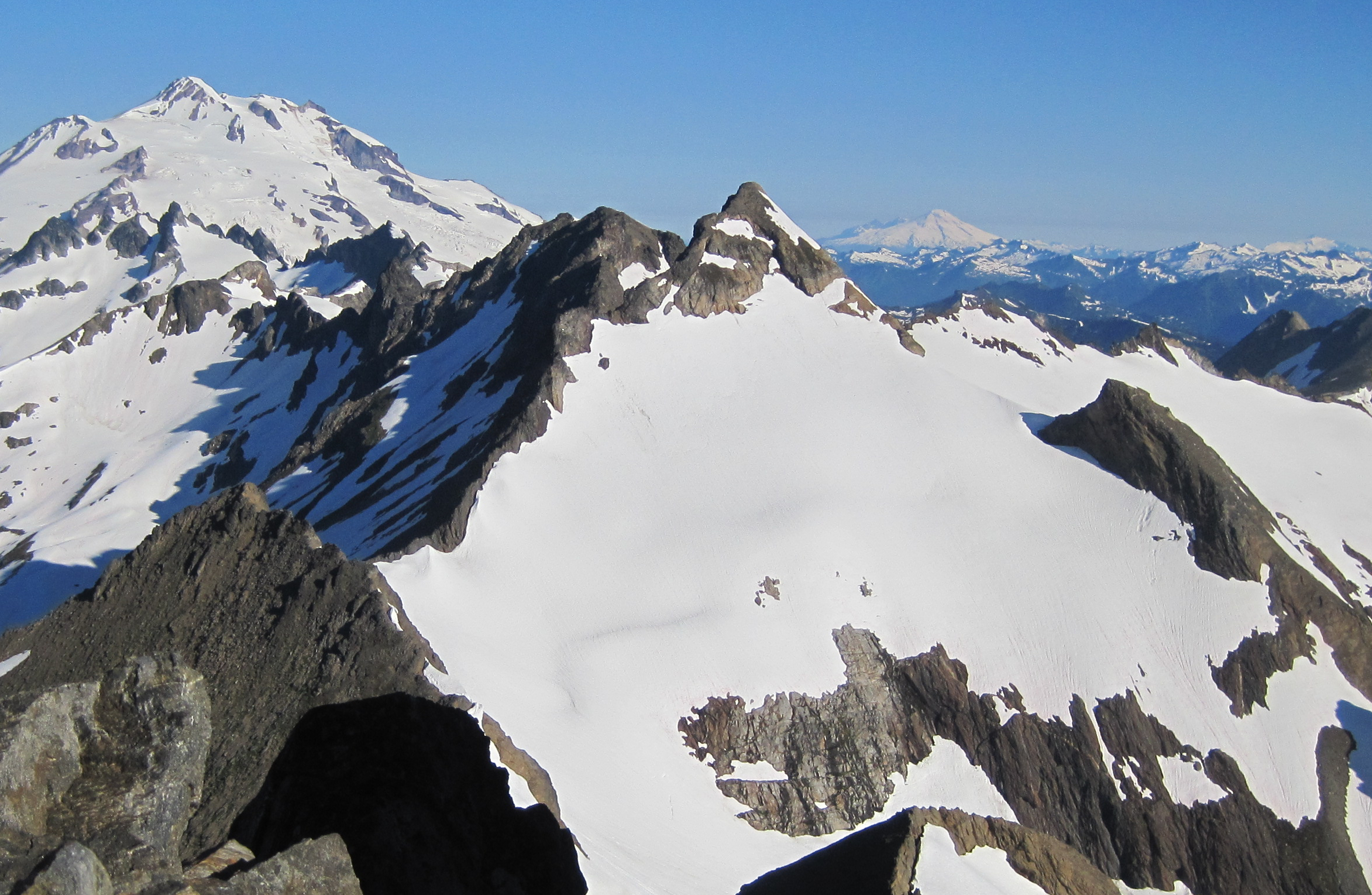
- Luahna Peak seen from Clark Mountain (Glacier Peak in upper left corner)

Highest point
- Elevation: 8,445 ft (2,574 m)
- Prominence: 810 ft (247 m)
- Coordinates: 48°03′38″N 120°59′06″W

Geography
- Location within Washington (state) Location within the United States
- Interactive map of Luahna Peak
- Country: United States
- State: Washington
- County: Chelan
- Protected area: Glacier Peak Wilderness
- Parent range: North Cascades; Cascade Range
- Topo map: USGS Clark Mountain

Geology
- Rock type: Schist

Climbing
- First ascent: 1911
- Easiest route: Scrambling and glacier travel

Luahna Peak is an 8,445-foot (2,574-metre) double summit mountain located in the Glacier Peak Wilderness of the North Cascades in Washington state. The true summit is 8,445 feet in elevation, and the northwest subpeak is 8,369 feet. The mountain is situated in Chelan County, in the Wenatchee National Forest. Luahna Peak is the second highest in the Dakobed Range after Clark Mountain which is 1.04 mi (1.67 km) to the southeast, and Luahna lies 6.95 mi (11.18 km) southeast of Glacier Peak. The Richardson Glacier lies to the southeast of the summit, with the Pilz Glacier and Butterfly Glacier stretching across the northern slope. Precipitation runoff from the peak drains into the White River and Napeequa River, both tributaries of the Wenatchee River. The first ascent of the summit was made on August 13, 1911, by Rodney Glisan, H.H. Prouty, Winthrop Stone, C.W. Whittlesey, all of whom were members of the Mazamas.

== Geology ==
The North Cascades features some of the most rugged topography in the Cascade Range with craggy peaks, spires, ridges, and deep glacial valleys. Geological events occurring many years ago created the diverse topography and drastic elevation changes over the Cascade Range leading to various climate differences.

The history of the formation of the Cascade Mountains dates back millions of years ago to the late Eocene Epoch. With the North American Plate overriding the Pacific Plate, episodes of volcanic igneous activity persisted. In addition, small fragments of the oceanic and continental lithosphere called terranes created the North Cascades about 50 million years ago.

During the Pleistocene period dating back over two million years ago, glaciation advancing and retreating repeatedly scoured the landscape leaving deposits of rock debris. The U-shaped cross section of the river valleys is a result of recent glaciation. Uplift and faulting in combination with glaciation have been the dominant processes which have created the tall peaks and deep valleys of the North Cascades area.

== Climate ==
Luahna Peak is located in the marine west coast climate zone of western North America. Weather fronts originating in the Pacific Ocean travel northeast toward the Cascade Mountains. As fronts approach the North Cascades, they are forced upward by the peaks (orographic lift), causing them to drop their moisture in the form of rain or snow onto the Cascades. As a result, Luahna Peak experiences high precipitation, especially during the winter months in the form of snowfall which feeds its glaciers. During winter months, weather is usually cloudy, but due to high pressure systems over the Pacific Ocean that intensify during summer months, there is often little or no cloud cover during the summer with optimum weather for climbing Luahna from July through September.

== Gallery ==
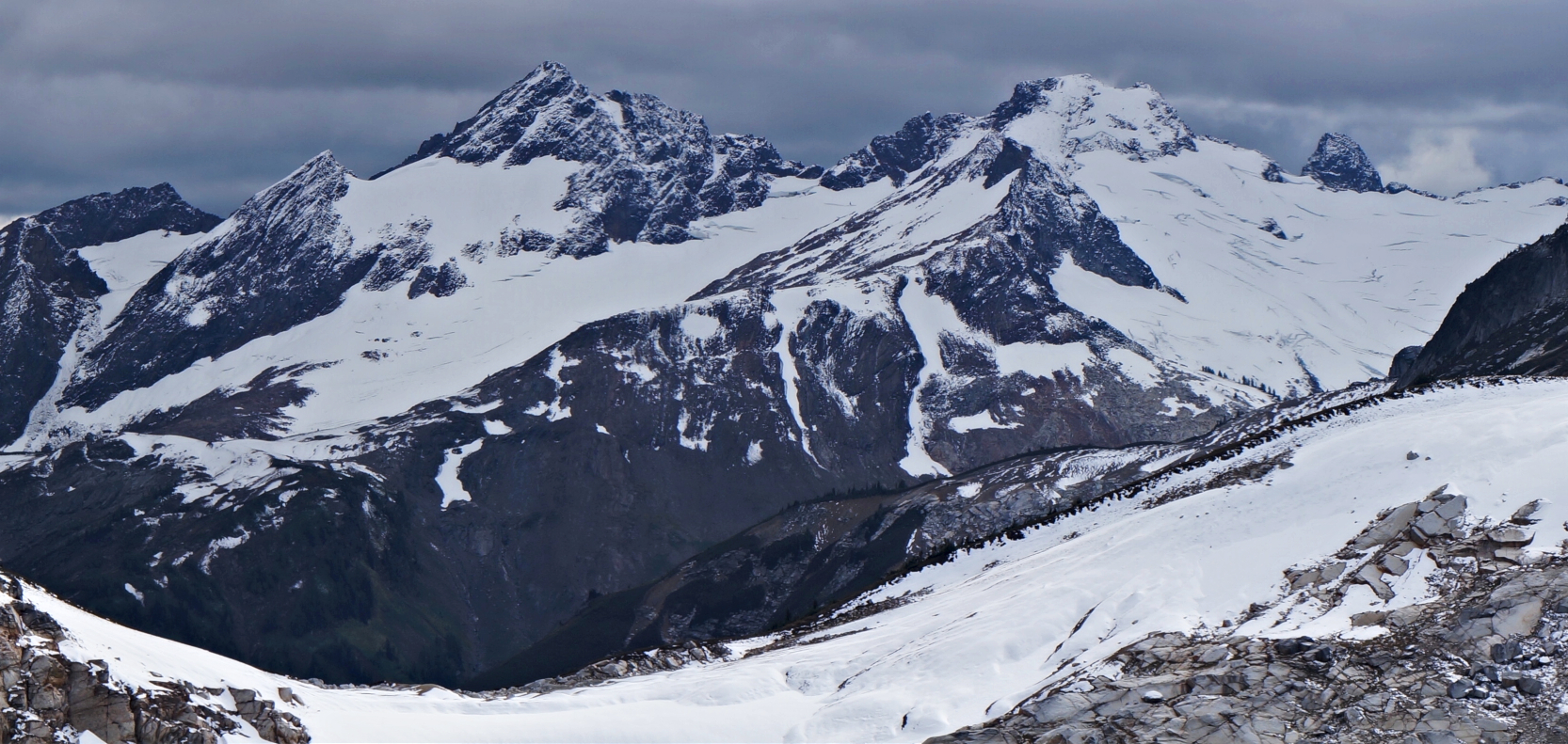
Luahna Peak from High Pass. True summit and Pilz Glacier on left; Luahna's northwest summit (aka "Chalangin Peak") and Butterfly Glacier on right

== See also ==
- Geography of the North Cascades
- List of mountain peaks of Washington (state)
