= REI =

American retail and outdoor recreation consumer cooperative

Recreational Equipment, Inc.
- REI logo (2015–present)
- Type: Corporation
- Industry: Retail
- Founded: June 23, 1938; 88 years ago in Seattle, Washington
- Headquarters: Issaquah, Washington, U.S.
- Number of locations: 179 (September 2023)
- Key people: Mary Beth Laughton, president and CEO
- Products: Camping gear and outdoor gear
- Revenue: US$3.7 billion (2021)
- Operating income: US$324 million (2021)
- Net income: US$97.7 million (2021)
- Members: 24.5 million
- Number of employees: 15,000
- Website: www.rei.com

Recreational Equipment, Inc., doing business as REI, is an American retail and outdoor recreation services corporation. It was formerly governed, and continues to brand itself, as a consumers' co-operative. REI sells camping gear, hiking, climbing, cycling, water, running, fitness, snow, travel equipment, and men's, women's, and children's clothing. Unlike other outdoor sports stores, it does not sell hunting or fishing equipment.

REI operates 194 retail stores in 44 states. It also receives orders online.

== History ==
Lloyd (1902–2000) and Mary (Gaiser) Anderson (1909–2017) founded REI in Seattle, Washington, in 1938. The Andersons had imported an Akadem Pickel ice axe from Austria, for themselves, as part of The Mountaineers Basic Climbing Course; from there, the two decided to set up a co-operative to help other outdoor enthusiasts in the club acquire good-quality climbing gear at reasonable prices. On June 23, 1938, with the aid of Seattle attorney Ed Rombauer, five Mountaineers met at Rombauer's office, and each paid one dollar to join the Recreational Equipment Cooperative.

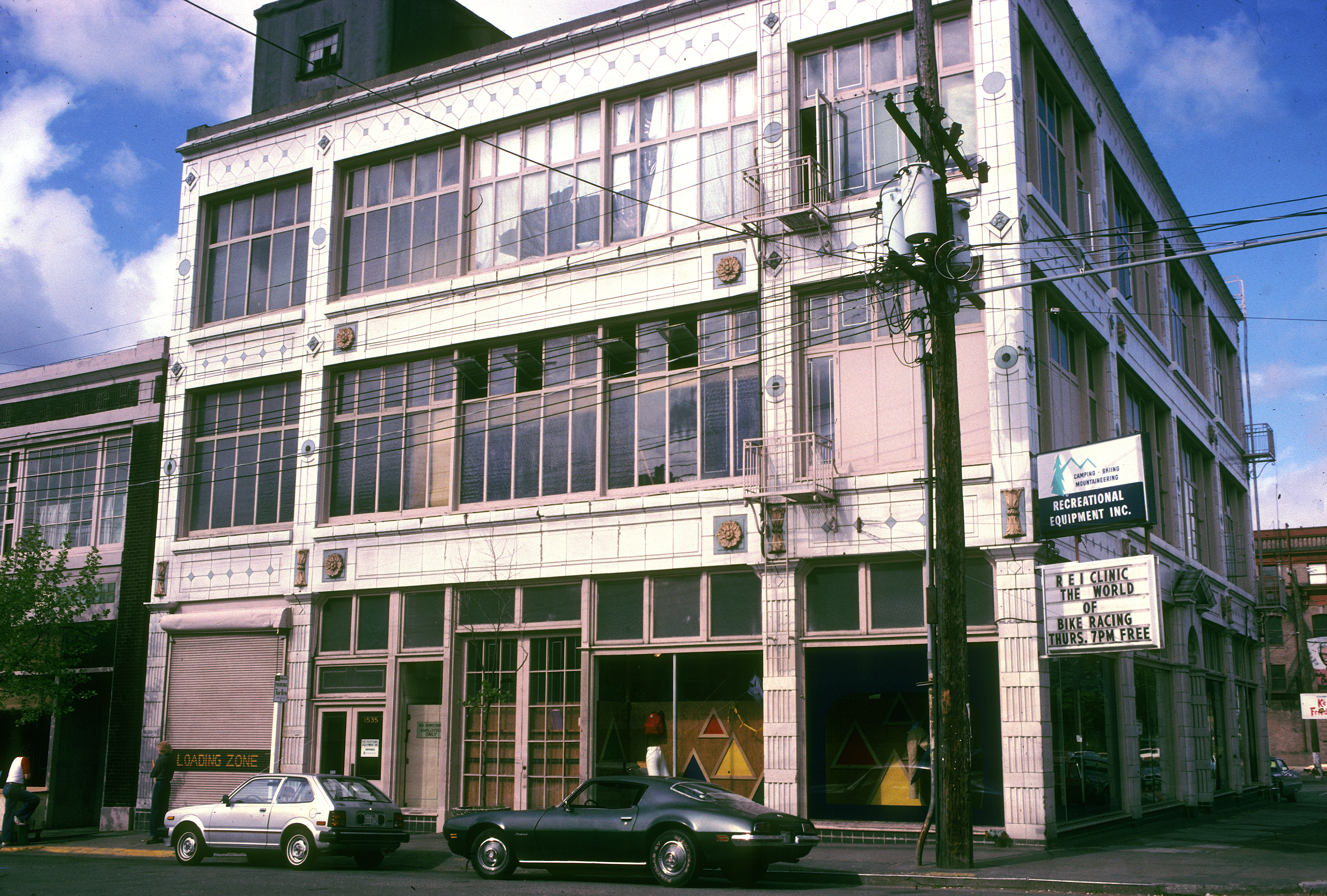
Flagship store (1962–1996) in Seattle, circa 1980; 11th & Pine on Capitol Hill

During its first year, Recreational Equipment was just a shelf at the Puget Sound Cooperative Store, a farmers' co-op near Pike Place Market in Seattle. In 1942, Lloyd moved the business to a new space down the hall from The Mountaineers’ club rooms on Pike Street. Jim Whittaker was hired as REI's first full-time employee in July 1955. In 1956, the Recreational Equipment Cooperative was incorporated. Whittaker served as CEO during the 1960s and was an early board member alongside American Alpine Club president Nicholas Clinch. When Whittaker became the first American to summit Mount Everest in May 1963, it provided REI with so much free advertising that the following year, the company’s gross income topped $1 million for the first time.

Through the 1970s, REI identified itself prominently as REI Co-op, focusing primarily on equipment for serious climbers, backpackers, and mountaineering expeditions. In the 1980s, following changes to its board of directors, REI’s emphasis expanded to include camping, kayaking, bicycling, and other outdoor activities. The company acquired the local outdoor gear firm Mountain Safety Research (MSR) in 1981. MSR later bought tent-maker Edgeworks and began producing tents under the MSR brand. REI retained ownership of MSR until 2001, when it exited the manufacturing business and sold the operation to Cascade Designs, another successful outdoor gear company in the Seattle area. Clothing, particularly "sport-casual" apparel, also became a greater part of the company's product line. Although the company remained a cooperative, providing special services to its members, the "co-op" moniker was dropped from much of its literature and advertising. Beginning in 2014, with the introduction of the REI Co-Op clothing line, REI publicly re-emphasized the cooperative aspect of its business model. In October 2015, the company launched a redesigned logo that included the word "co-op" for the first time since 1983.

Sally Jewell joined the board of REI in 1996 and was named chief operating officer in 2000. She then became CEO in 2005. Jewell remained CEO of REI until she was named United States Secretary of the Interior in April of 2013. She was succeeded by Jerry Stritzke, former president and COO of Coach New York, who was named president and CEO of REI in August 2013. Stritzke resigned in February 2019. Eric Artz, previously COO of the company, was named CEO and president of REI in May 2019. In January 2025, Artz announced his retirement to be effective in March 2025. He was succeeded as CEO by Mary Beth Laughton, who was previously the board director for REI.

After the Parkland high school shooting, REI joined the 2018 NRA boycott and suspended orders from Vista Outdoor, a maker of outdoor products and rifles.

On Black Friday of 2015, REI "did the unexpected" by closing all of its stores and temporarily halting the processing of online purchases, giving all of its employees a paid day off. Although Black Friday has traditionally been one of REI's top-10 days for annual sales, the company abstained from Black Friday and launched an #OptOutside marketing campaign, urging people to spend their time outside. REI is the first major US retailer to forgo operations on Black Friday. They continued the initiative through the 2022 holiday season.

On January 31, 2023, REI laid off eight percent of its corporate staff, eliminating 167 positions. The layoffs were attributed to the need to return REI to profitability amidst a challenging economic environment, with the company experiencing a decline in outdoor gear sales following a pandemic boom.

In January 2025, REI announced that it would lay off 400+ employees, ending its unprofitable REI Experiences classes, day tours, and adventure tourism packages. In October, the company announced it would close three stores in Boston, New York City, and Paramus, New Jersey.

In October 2026, REI was ranked number 5 on the Forbes Best Customer Service list.

== Non-retail diversification ==
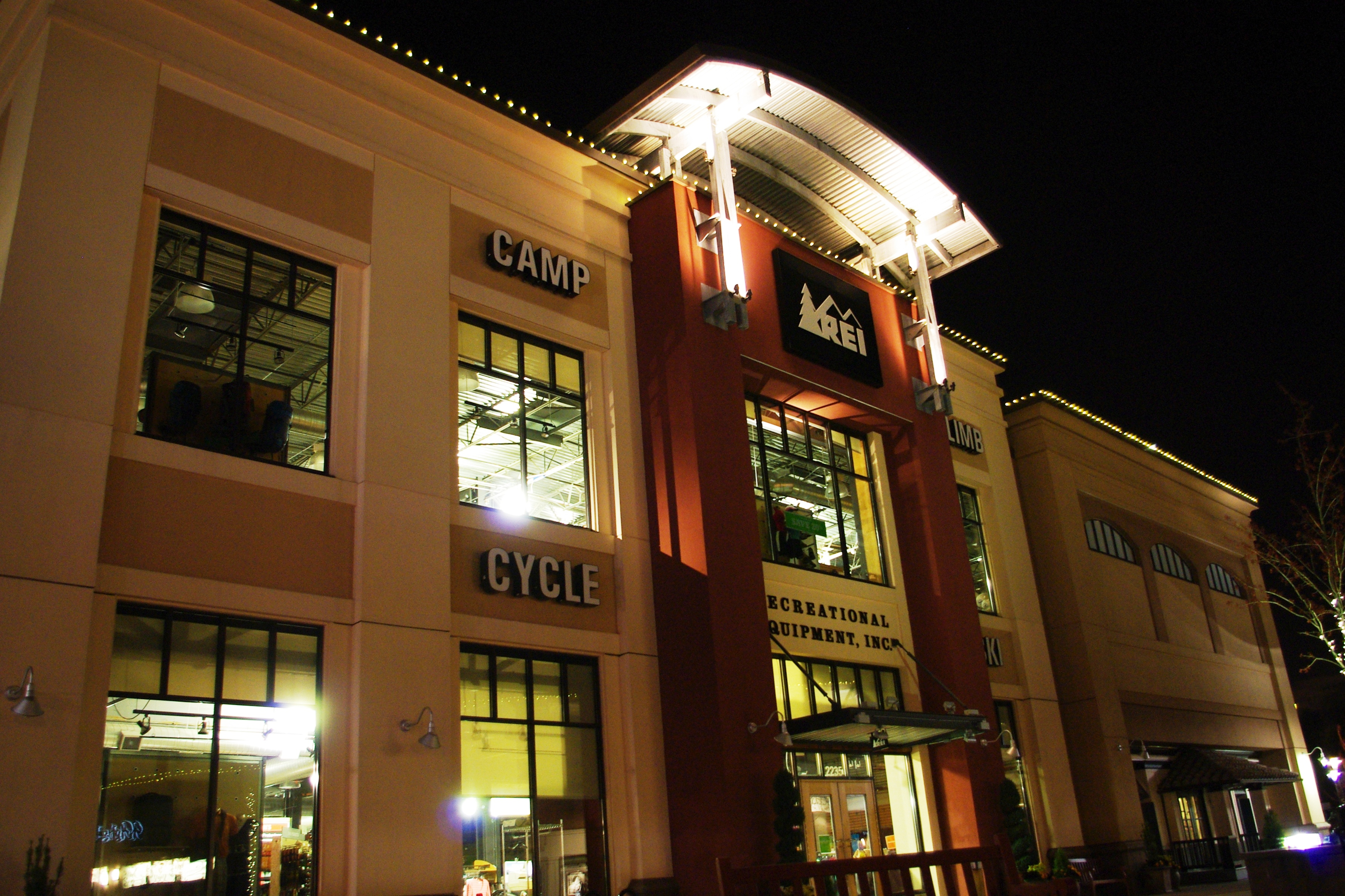
REI store in Hillsboro, Oregon

In 1987, REI expanded its business by launching REI Adventures, a branch that managed travel trips for active tourists worldwide. Later, in 2006, the company created the Outdoor School which consisted of one-day local trips and in-store instructional classes.

On June 11, 2015, REI bought Adventure Projects Inc., a Boulder-based company, founded by Nick Wilder and Mike Ahnemann in 2012, which is best known for its climbing website, Mountain Project, with guides to more than 128,000 climbing routes across the world. It has since expanded by creating MTBProject.com, a website for mountain bike trail maps, HikingProject.com, for hiking trails, PowderProject.com, for backcountry skiing trails, and TrailRunProject.com, for cross-country running trails.

On January 8, 2025, REI announced that it was ending the "Experiences" businesses, laying off hundreds of employees. REI’s president and CEO, Eric Artz, said that the Experiences business served only 40,000 customers in 2024, less than 0.4% of all co-op customers, and was unprofitable.

== Locations ==
REI was headquartered in Kent, Washington. A new headquarters campus in the Spring District of Bellevue, Washington, was announced in 2016 and planned to open in 2020. The sale of the new headquarters campus was announced in August 2020 amid the COVID-19 pandemic, with REI corporate employees shifting to remote work.

The company has five flagship stores in major U.S. cities that include event rooms and indoor climbing walls. Their Seattle flagship, in the Cascade neighborhood of Downtown Seattle, opened in 1996. It was followed by flagship locations in Bloomington, Minnesota; the Uline Arena in Washington, D.C.; New York City; and Denver, Colorado. REI announced in July 2026 that the flagship store in New York City would close in October 2026.

== Membership ==
REI is owned by its active members, persons who have paid a lifetime membership fee, which is currently $30. Each active member is entitled to vote for members of the company's board of directors, from among candidates approved by the incumbent board. Members are also eligible to receive a patronage "dividend" on qualifying purchases; this dividend is issued as store credit, not redeemable in currency. The lifetime fee was just five dollars in 1985.

The annual member reward (formerly called a "dividend") is normally equal to 10% of what a member spent at REI on regular-priced merchandise in the prior year; it has no numerical relationship to REI's profits.

== Governance ==
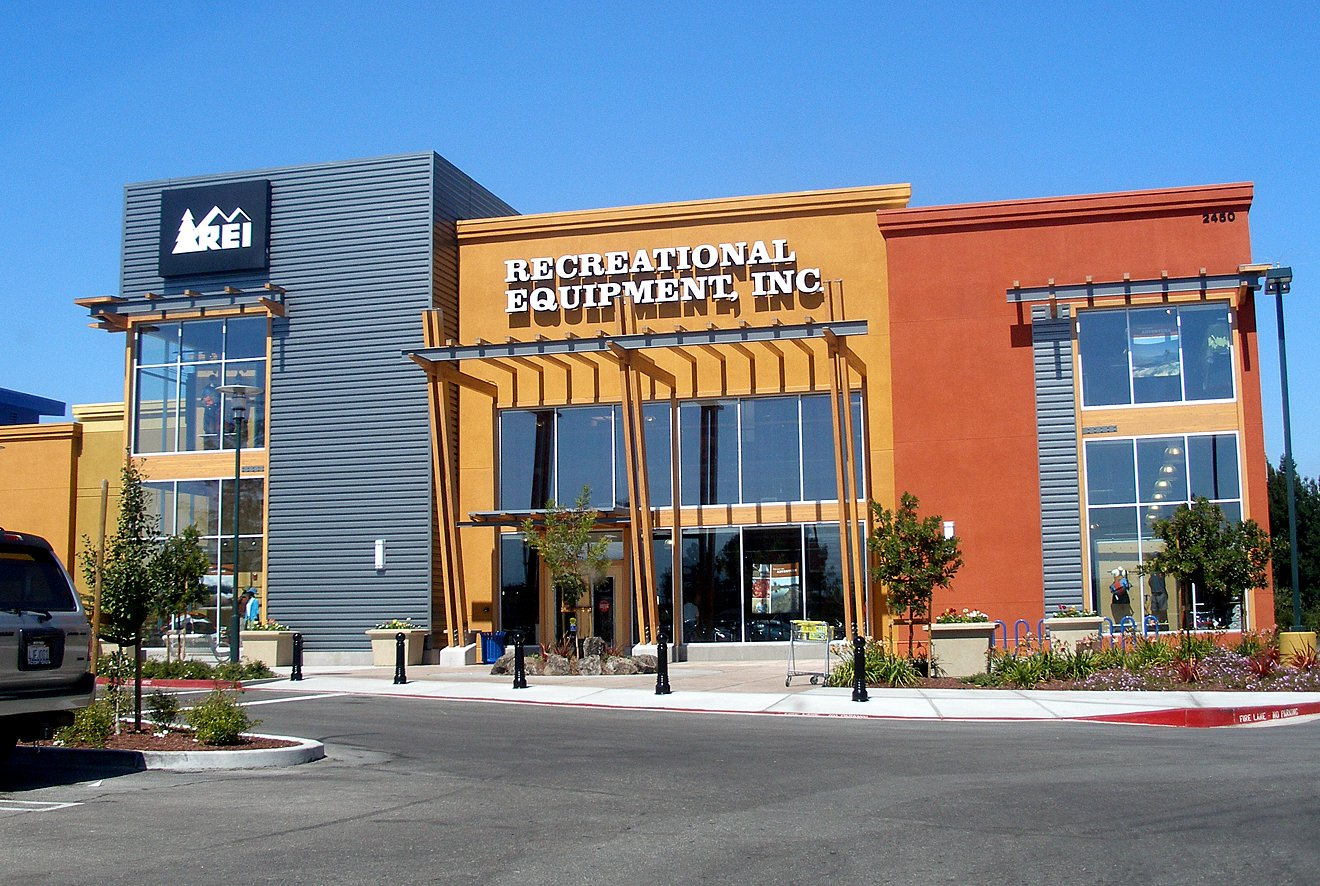
REI store in Mountain View, California (2006–2021)

REI is a Washington corporation governed by a board of 13 directors, including the CEO. Directors serve for terms of one or three years. Board candidates are selected by the REI board nomination and governance committee.

In earlier years, board elections were competitive elections, with both board-nominated and self-nominated petition candidates. In recent years, REI eliminated the opportunity for petition candidates and has nominated only as many candidates as open positions. Members are mailed a ballot, and nominees must garner 50% of returned ballots; members may also vote online. While theoretically the board serves at the members' pleasure, there is no path to board membership without the approval of the board nomination and governance committee, and the incumbent board has the right to fill by appointment any board seats not filled by election.

For 2014, its chief executive officer received compensation of approximately $2.71 million.

== Labor ==
REI employed over 15,000 people as of January 2022, most of them in its stores, many of whom are part-time. Employees receive discounts on merchandise, may be eligible for free or discounted outdoor classes, and also receive a "Way day" pass, entitling them to spend up to 6 hours outdoors for pay.

REI has been ranked in the top 100 Companies to Work For in the United States by Fortune since 1985, which earned it a place in the Fortune "Hall of Fame." REI ranked as #8 in 2012, #69 in 2014, #58 in 2015, #26 in 2016, and #28 in 2017.

=== Labor organizing and criticism ===
Since 2016, REI workers have been publicly organizing around workplace issues such as living wages, erratic and insufficient scheduling, access to benefits like healthcare, and safety protocols. The company has been accused of union busting by forcing employees to attend captive audience meetings, putting up anti-union flyers, and using "social justice language" and its status as a retail cooperative to mislead the public into believing it is a worker cooperative.

In January 2022, the SoHo, Manhattan location filed REI's first-ever National Labor Relations Board petition to vote to become a union. In March of that year, the SoHo-based workers voted overwhelmingly in favor of unionization with the Retail, Wholesale, and Department Store Union (RWDSU) by a vote of 88-14.

In March 2023, REI workers in Orange, Ohio, voted to unionize by a vote of 27-12. The following month, the Eugene, Oregon, location filed a petition for union elections with the National Labor Relations Board. In May, the company's Durham, North Carolina, store workers voted 20-12 to unionize with the United Food and Commercial Workers International Union, after a four-day strike precipitated by the co-op's alleged retaliation against a union organizer. Durham thus became the sixth REI store to unionize. In November 2023, workers at eight REI retail stores accused the company of dozens of violations of federal labor law, including retaliating against pro-union workers, altering working conditions without union consultation, and refusing to bargain in good faith with unions at stores that had voted in favor of unionization.

In March 2026, HuffPost reported that unionized workers approved a vote to launch a customer boycott against the business during its annual anniversary sale event.

In July 2026, REI announced that the SoHo, Manhattan location would close in October, with all employees being laid off. In the four years since the unionization vote in 2022, the company and the workers could not agree on a new contract.

== Environmental and community initiatives ==
To support local communities, REI offers meeting space free of charge to non-profit organizations, supports conservation efforts, and organizes yearly outdoor service outings. REI donates annually to conservation groups in the US. Its 2007 giving of $3.7 million represented about 0.28% of its $1.3 billion in gross sales.
